This is a partial list of unnumbered minor planets for principal provisional designations assigned during 1–15 October 2001. , a total of 476 bodies remain unnumbered for this period. Objects for this year are listed on the following pages: A–E · Fi · Fii · G–O · P–R · S · T · U · V–W and X–Y. Also see previous and next year.

T 

|- id="2001 TB" bgcolor=#FFC2E0
| 6 || 2001 TB || APO || 24.4 || data-sort-value="0.047" | 47 m || single || 3 days || 08 Oct 2001 || 35 || align=left | Disc.: LINEAR || 
|- id="2001 TC" bgcolor=#FFC2E0
| 3 || 2001 TC || AMO || 20.7 || data-sort-value="0.26" | 260 m || multiple || 2001–2015 || 14 Nov 2015 || 76 || align=left | Disc.: NEAT || 
|- id="2001 TD" bgcolor=#FFC2E0
| 7 || 2001 TD || ATE || 25.1 || data-sort-value="0.034" | 34 m || single || 8 days || 16 Oct 2001 || 30 || align=left | Disc.: LINEAR || 
|- id="2001 TN" bgcolor=#fefefe
| 2 || 2001 TN || MBA-I || 18.3 || data-sort-value="0.65" | 650 m || multiple || 2001–2020 || 17 Oct 2020 || 80 || align=left | Disc.: NEAT || 
|- id="2001 TO" bgcolor=#FA8072
| 0 || 2001 TO || MCA || 19.1 || data-sort-value="0.45" | 450 m || multiple || 2001–2018 || 16 Nov 2018 || 119 || align=left | Disc.: NEAT || 
|- id="2001 TQ" bgcolor=#fefefe
| 1 || 2001 TQ || MBA-I || 17.8 || data-sort-value="0.82" | 820 m || multiple || 2001–2019 || 25 Nov 2019 || 83 || align=left | Disc.: NEAT || 
|- id="2001 TO1" bgcolor=#E9E9E9
| 0 ||  || MBA-M || 17.30 || 1.5 km || multiple || 2001–2021 || 03 Apr 2021 || 95 || align=left | Disc.: Farpoint Obs.Alt.: 2014 SO67 || 
|- id="2001 TS1" bgcolor=#FA8072
| 1 ||  || MCA || 17.2 || 1.1 km || multiple || 2001–2019 || 25 Nov 2019 || 168 || align=left | Disc.: NEATAlt.: 2007 EC56 || 
|- id="2001 TY1" bgcolor=#FFC2E0
| 2 ||  || APO || 25.0 || data-sort-value="0.036" | 36 m || single || 40 days || 15 Nov 2001 || 40 || align=left | Disc.: LINEAR || 
|- id="2001 TA2" bgcolor=#FFC2E0
| 2 ||  || APO || 22.0 || data-sort-value="0.14" | 140 m || multiple || 2001–2013 || 30 Mar 2013 || 117 || align=left | Disc.: LINEARPotentially hazardous objectAlt.: 2013 FH || 
|- id="2001 TB2" bgcolor=#FFC2E0
| 6 ||  || AMO || 21.5 || data-sort-value="0.18" | 180 m || single || 38 days || 18 Nov 2001 || 68 || align=left | Disc.: LINEAR || 
|- id="2001 TS2" bgcolor=#fefefe
| 2 ||  || MBA-I || 18.2 || data-sort-value="0.68" | 680 m || multiple || 2001–2019 || 02 Nov 2019 || 94 || align=left | Disc.: NEAT || 
|- id="2001 TE3" bgcolor=#FA8072
| 1 ||  || MCA || 19.69 || data-sort-value="0.34" | 340 m || multiple || 2001–2019 || 03 Apr 2019 || 73 || align=left | Disc.: NEAT || 
|- id="2001 TO5" bgcolor=#fefefe
| 0 ||  || MBA-I || 17.6 || data-sort-value="0.90" | 900 m || multiple || 2001–2021 || 18 Jan 2021 || 139 || align=left | Disc.: NEAT || 
|- id="2001 TR5" bgcolor=#E9E9E9
| 0 ||  || MBA-M || 16.79 || 1.8 km || multiple || 1997–2021 || 09 May 2021 || 269 || align=left | Disc.: NEAT || 
|- id="2001 TU6" bgcolor=#fefefe
| 0 ||  || MBA-I || 18.12 || data-sort-value="0.71" | 710 m || multiple || 2001–2021 || 08 May 2021 || 151 || align=left | Disc.: NEAT || 
|- id="2001 TV6" bgcolor=#E9E9E9
| 0 ||  || MBA-M || 17.28 || 1.5 km || multiple || 2001–2021 || 06 Apr 2021 || 93 || align=left | Disc.: NEATAlt.: 2010 UX57 || 
|- id="2001 TK7" bgcolor=#E9E9E9
| 0 ||  || MBA-M || 17.7 || 1.2 km || multiple || 2001–2018 || 16 Nov 2018 || 52 || align=left | Disc.: NEATAlt.: 2014 RQ18 || 
|- id="2001 TM7" bgcolor=#FA8072
| 3 ||  || MCA || 18.9 || data-sort-value="0.70" | 700 m || multiple || 2001–2018 || 05 Oct 2018 || 55 || align=left | Disc.: NEAT || 
|- id="2001 TG13" bgcolor=#fefefe
| 0 ||  || HUN || 18.32 || data-sort-value="0.64" | 640 m || multiple || 2001–2021 || 15 May 2021 || 119 || align=left | Disc.: LINEARAlt.: 2013 GZ27 || 
|- id="2001 TK13" bgcolor=#FA8072
| 0 ||  || HUN || 18.2 || data-sort-value="0.68" | 680 m || multiple || 2001–2020 || 28 Jan 2020 || 261 || align=left | Disc.: LINEARAlt.: 2013 HK || 
|- id="2001 TO13" bgcolor=#FA8072
| 0 ||  || MCA || 18.25 || data-sort-value="0.67" | 670 m || multiple || 2001–2021 || 16 Jun 2021 || 76 || align=left | Disc.: LINEAR || 
|- id="2001 TC14" bgcolor=#fefefe
| 1 ||  || MBA-I || 18.3 || data-sort-value="0.65" | 650 m || multiple || 2001–2021 || 17 Jan 2021 || 125 || align=left | Disc.: Powell Obs.Alt.: 2016 XJ7 || 
|- id="2001 TF17" bgcolor=#FA8072
| 2 ||  || MCA || 18.9 || data-sort-value="0.49" | 490 m || multiple || 2001–2005 || 27 Oct 2005 || 56 || align=left | Disc.: LINEAR || 
|- id="2001 TX22" bgcolor=#d6d6d6
| 0 ||  || MBA-O || 16.6 || 2.7 km || multiple || 2001–2018 || 17 Dec 2018 || 57 || align=left | Disc.: LINEAR || 
|- id="2001 TU25" bgcolor=#E9E9E9
| 0 ||  || MBA-M || 17.26 || 1.5 km || multiple || 2001–2021 || 14 Apr 2021 || 116 || align=left | Disc.: LINEAR || 
|- id="2001 TM26" bgcolor=#E9E9E9
| 0 ||  || MBA-M || 16.5 || 2.8 km || multiple || 2001–2021 || 21 Jan 2021 || 277 || align=left | Disc.: LINEARAlt.: 2010 UT8, 2010 UG10 || 
|- id="2001 TY44" bgcolor=#FFC2E0
| 0 ||  || AMO || 20.3 || data-sort-value="0.31" | 310 m || multiple || 2001–2019 || 28 Aug 2019 || 149 || align=left | Disc.: LINEAR || 
|- id="2001 TB45" bgcolor=#FFC2E0
| 2 ||  || AMO || 18.6 || data-sort-value="0.68" | 680 m || multiple || 2001–2018 || 18 Mar 2018 || 89 || align=left | Disc.: LINEAR || 
|- id="2001 TC45" bgcolor=#FFC2E0
| 0 ||  || APO || 19.53 || data-sort-value="0.44" | 440 m || multiple || 2001–2021 || 13 Sep 2021 || 143 || align=left | Disc.: LINEARPotentially hazardous object || 
|- id="2001 TE45" bgcolor=#FFC2E0
| 9 ||  || APO || 22.9 || data-sort-value="0.093" | 93 m || single || 6 days || 21 Oct 2001 || 26 || align=left | Disc.: AMOS || 
|- id="2001 TE46" bgcolor=#fefefe
| 2 ||  || MBA-I || 18.2 || data-sort-value="0.90" | 700 m || multiple || 2001-2022 || 15 Dec 2022 || 26 || align=left | Disc.: LINEAR || 
|- id="2001 TS50" bgcolor=#E9E9E9
| 0 ||  || MBA-M || 17.36 || 1.4 km || multiple || 2001–2021 || 06 Apr 2021 || 178 || align=left | Disc.: LINEAR || 
|- id="2001 TN51" bgcolor=#E9E9E9
| 1 ||  || MBA-M || 17.7 || data-sort-value="0.86" | 860 m || multiple || 2001–2019 || 08 Jan 2019 || 79 || align=left | Disc.: LINEARAlt.: 2005 SC19 || 
|- id="2001 TH54" bgcolor=#FA8072
| 0 ||  || MCA || 17.85 || data-sort-value="0.80" | 800 m || multiple || 2001–2021 || 27 Jun 2021 || 55 || align=left | Disc.: LINEAR || 
|- id="2001 TM55" bgcolor=#E9E9E9
| 1 ||  || MBA-M || 17.4 || 1.4 km || multiple || 2001–2015 || 17 Jan 2015 || 34 || align=left | Disc.: LINEAR || 
|- id="2001 TM58" bgcolor=#fefefe
| 1 ||  || MBA-I || 18.2 || data-sort-value="0.68" | 680 m || multiple || 2001–2021 || 15 Jan 2021 || 98 || align=left | Disc.: LINEARAlt.: 2012 QC29 || 
|- id="2001 TY58" bgcolor=#E9E9E9
| 3 ||  || MBA-M || 18.1 || 1.0 km || multiple || 2001–2018 || 17 Nov 2018 || 71 || align=left | Disc.: LINEAR || 
|- id="2001 TJ59" bgcolor=#fefefe
| 1 ||  || MBA-I || 17.8 || data-sort-value="0.82" | 820 m || multiple || 2001–2019 || 25 Oct 2019 || 125 || align=left | Disc.: LINEARAlt.: 2012 TR10 || 
|- id="2001 TT59" bgcolor=#fefefe
| 0 ||  || MBA-I || 18.0 || data-sort-value="0.75" | 750 m || multiple || 2001–2021 || 18 Jan 2021 || 93 || align=left | Disc.: LINEAR || 
|- id="2001 TT60" bgcolor=#fefefe
| 0 ||  || MBA-I || 17.5 || data-sort-value="0.94" | 940 m || multiple || 2001–2021 || 11 Jan 2021 || 214 || align=left | Disc.: LINEARAlt.: 2016 NS29 || 
|- id="2001 TS61" bgcolor=#FA8072
| 0 ||  || MCA || 18.21 || data-sort-value="0.68" | 680 m || multiple || 2001–2021 || 10 Apr 2021 || 119 || align=left | Disc.: LINEAR || 
|- id="2001 TB62" bgcolor=#fefefe
| 3 ||  || MBA-I || 18.5 || data-sort-value="0.59" | 590 m || multiple || 2001–2015 || 09 Oct 2015 || 52 || align=left | Disc.: LINEAR || 
|- id="2001 TK71" bgcolor=#E9E9E9
| 0 ||  || MBA-M || 17.78 || 1.2 km || multiple || 2001–2021 || 09 May 2021 || 137 || align=left | Disc.: LINEAR || 
|- id="2001 TS81" bgcolor=#fefefe
| 2 ||  || MBA-I || 17.9 || data-sort-value="0.78" | 780 m || multiple || 2001–2014 || 05 Mar 2014 || 73 || align=left | Disc.: LINEARAlt.: 2014 EJ90 || 
|- id="2001 TZ82" bgcolor=#fefefe
| 0 ||  || MBA-I || 17.8 || data-sort-value="0.82" | 820 m || multiple || 2001–2021 || 14 Jan 2021 || 172 || align=left | Disc.: LINEARAlt.: 2010 KF139 || 
|- id="2001 TL84" bgcolor=#d6d6d6
| 0 ||  || MBA-O || 16.41 || 2.9 km || multiple || 2001–2021 || 08 May 2021 || 107 || align=left | Disc.: LINEAR || 
|- id="2001 TL87" bgcolor=#E9E9E9
| 0 ||  || MBA-M || 18.2 || data-sort-value="0.68" | 680 m || multiple || 2001–2019 || 08 Jan 2019 || 44 || align=left | Disc.: LINEAR || 
|- id="2001 TO89" bgcolor=#d6d6d6
| 0 ||  || MBA-O || 16.2 || 3.2 km || multiple || 2001–2020 || 16 May 2020 || 111 || align=left | Disc.: LINEARAlt.: 2009 ED6 || 
|- id="2001 TU96" bgcolor=#E9E9E9
| 0 ||  || MBA-M || 17.22 || 1.5 km || multiple || 2001–2021 || 30 May 2021 || 192 || align=left | Disc.: LINEAR || 
|- id="2001 TE99" bgcolor=#FA8072
| 1 ||  || MCA || 18.86 || data-sort-value="0.50" | 500 m || multiple || 2001–2021 || 30 Nov 2021 || 78 || align=left | Disc.: LINEARAlt.: 2011 UN24 || 
|- id="2001 TL101" bgcolor=#E9E9E9
| 0 ||  || MBA-M || 16.5 || 2.8 km || multiple || 2001–2021 || 14 Jan 2021 || 105 || align=left | Disc.: LINEAR || 
|- id="2001 TH102" bgcolor=#E9E9E9
| 4 ||  || MBA-M || 17.0 || 1.2 km || multiple || 2001–2017 || 27 May 2017 || 25 || align=left | Disc.: LINEARAlt.: 2017 KA25 || 
|- id="2001 TR103" bgcolor=#FA8072
| 1 ||  || MCA || 18.6 || data-sort-value="0.57" | 570 m || multiple || 2001–2019 || 30 Dec 2019 || 107 || align=left | Disc.: NEATAlt.: 2008 SA296 || 
|- id="2001 TS103" bgcolor=#d6d6d6
| 1 ||  || MBA-O || 18.0 || 1.4 km || multiple || 2001–2017 || 07 Nov 2017 || 30 || align=left | Disc.: NEATAlt.: 2012 TN140 || 
|- id="2001 TZ103" bgcolor=#E9E9E9
| 1 ||  || MBA-M || 17.5 || 1.8 km || multiple || 2001–2020 || 25 Jan 2020 || 284 || align=left | Disc.: Desert Eagle Obs. || 
|- id="2001 TN108" bgcolor=#d6d6d6
| 0 ||  || MBA-O || 16.30 || 3.1 km || multiple || 2001–2021 || 10 Apr 2021 || 92 || align=left | Disc.: LINEARAlt.: 2007 WJ11 || 
|- id="2001 TR112" bgcolor=#E9E9E9
| 0 ||  || MBA-M || 17.64 || 1.7 km || multiple || 2001–2021 || 12 Apr 2021 || 137 || align=left | Disc.: LINEARAlt.: 2010 OU15 || 
|- id="2001 TS112" bgcolor=#E9E9E9
| 0 ||  || MBA-M || 17.16 || 2.1 km || multiple || 2001–2021 || 10 Apr 2021 || 170 || align=left | Disc.: LINEAR || 
|- id="2001 TG118" bgcolor=#E9E9E9
| 0 ||  || MBA-M || 17.1 || 1.6 km || multiple || 2001–2019 || 03 Jan 2019 || 74 || align=left | Disc.: LINEAR || 
|- id="2001 TB126" bgcolor=#E9E9E9
| 1 ||  || MBA-M || 17.8 || 1.5 km || multiple || 2001–2020 || 19 Jan 2020 || 124 || align=left | Disc.: NEATAlt.: 2010 MJ56, 2015 YT16 || 
|- id="2001 TU126" bgcolor=#C2FFFF
| 0 ||  || JT || 14.26 || 7.8 km || multiple || 2001–2021 || 11 Jul 2021 || 126 || align=left | Disc.: SpacewatchTrojan camp (L5)Alt.: 2013 TB141 || 
|- id="2001 TU128" bgcolor=#d6d6d6
| – ||  || MBA-O || 17.8 || 1.5 km || single || 4 days || 15 Oct 2001 || 9 || align=left | Disc.: Spacewatch || 
|- id="2001 TW128" bgcolor=#fefefe
| 1 ||  || MBA-I || 18.4 || data-sort-value="0.62" | 620 m || multiple || 2001–2018 || 17 Jun 2018 || 78 || align=left | Disc.: SpacewatchAlt.: 2015 RK102 || 
|- id="2001 TB129" bgcolor=#d6d6d6
| 0 ||  || MBA-O || 16.5 || 2.8 km || multiple || 2001–2020 || 12 Dec 2020 || 61 || align=left | Disc.: SpacewatchAdded on 17 January 2021Alt.: 2007 RS159 || 
|- id="2001 TV129" bgcolor=#d6d6d6
| 2 ||  || HIL || 16.4 || 2.9 km || multiple || 2001–2017 || 10 Nov 2017 || 29 || align=left | Disc.: LPL/Spacewatch II || 
|- id="2001 TL130" bgcolor=#E9E9E9
| 0 ||  || MBA-M || 18.0 || 1.1 km || multiple || 2001–2020 || 01 Feb 2020 || 71 || align=left | Disc.: SpacewatchAlt.: 2014 QT426 || 
|- id="2001 TC131" bgcolor=#FA8072
| 2 ||  || MCA || 18.5 || data-sort-value="0.84" | 840 m || multiple || 2001–2018 || 14 Dec 2018 || 85 || align=left | Disc.: NEATAlt.: 2018 XH4 || 
|- id="2001 TE131" bgcolor=#fefefe
| 0 ||  || MBA-I || 18.0 || data-sort-value="0.75" | 750 m || multiple || 2001–2019 || 19 Sep 2019 || 56 || align=left | Disc.: NEAT || 
|- id="2001 TM132" bgcolor=#E9E9E9
| 0 ||  || MBA-M || 17.10 || 1.6 km || multiple || 2001–2021 || 09 Apr 2021 || 243 || align=left | Disc.: AMOS || 
|- id="2001 TV135" bgcolor=#E9E9E9
| 0 ||  || MBA-M || 17.03 || 1.7 km || multiple || 2001–2021 || 03 Apr 2021 || 159 || align=left | Disc.: NEAT || 
|- id="2001 TO140" bgcolor=#E9E9E9
| 0 ||  || MBA-M || 17.2 || 1.5 km || multiple || 2001–2020 || 21 Apr 2020 || 220 || align=left | Disc.: NEATAlt.: 2011 BQ85 || 
|- id="2001 TR140" bgcolor=#fefefe
| 0 ||  || MBA-I || 18.0 || data-sort-value="0.75" | 750 m || multiple || 2001–2020 || 12 Dec 2020 || 101 || align=left | Disc.: NEAT || 
|- id="2001 TW142" bgcolor=#E9E9E9
| 0 ||  || MBA-M || 17.4 || 1.4 km || multiple || 2001–2020 || 02 Feb 2020 || 88 || align=left | Disc.: NEATAlt.: 2014 SB309 || 
|- id="2001 TD143" bgcolor=#d6d6d6
| 0 ||  || MBA-O || 16.58 || 2.7 km || multiple || 2001–2021 || 01 May 2021 || 116 || align=left | Disc.: NEATAlt.: 2012 TV236 || 
|- id="2001 TG144" bgcolor=#fefefe
| 0 ||  || MBA-I || 18.51 || data-sort-value="0.59" | 590 m || multiple || 2001–2021 || 30 Jun 2021 || 138 || align=left | Disc.: NEAT || 
|- id="2001 TN144" bgcolor=#fefefe
| 0 ||  || MBA-I || 18.43 || data-sort-value="0.61" | 610 m || multiple || 1998–2021 || 17 Jan 2021 || 121 || align=left | Disc.: NEATAlt.: 2012 DU15 || 
|- id="2001 TS144" bgcolor=#E9E9E9
| 0 ||  || MBA-M || 17.6 || 1.3 km || multiple || 2001–2020 || 02 Feb 2020 || 86 || align=left | Disc.: NEATAlt.: 2014 SA316 || 
|- id="2001 TB145" bgcolor=#fefefe
| 4 ||  || MBA-I || 18.3 || data-sort-value="0.65" | 650 m || multiple || 2001–2020 || 21 May 2020 || 19 || align=left | Disc.: NEAT || 
|- id="2001 TC145" bgcolor=#E9E9E9
| 0 ||  || MBA-M || 18.3 || data-sort-value="0.92" | 920 m || multiple || 2001–2018 || 10 Nov 2018 || 88 || align=left | Disc.: NEATAlt.: 2018 RJ26 || 
|- id="2001 TN146" bgcolor=#fefefe
| 0 ||  || MBA-I || 17.3 || 1.0 km || multiple || 2000–2020 || 14 Dec 2020 || 173 || align=left | Disc.: NEATAlt.: 2012 RE10 || 
|- id="2001 TU146" bgcolor=#d6d6d6
| 0 ||  || MBA-O || 17.44 || 1.8 km || multiple || 2001–2021 || 08 May 2021 || 76 || align=left | Disc.: NEAT || 
|- id="2001 TA147" bgcolor=#fefefe
| 0 ||  || MBA-I || 18.0 || data-sort-value="0.75" | 750 m || multiple || 2001–2019 || 24 Dec 2019 || 72 || align=left | Disc.: NEATAlt.: 2012 VP34 || 
|- id="2001 TQ149" bgcolor=#fefefe
| 0 ||  || MBA-I || 17.7 || data-sort-value="0.86" | 860 m || multiple || 1994–2020 || 22 Feb 2020 || 200 || align=left | Disc.: La Silla Obs.Alt.: 1994 RR28, 2011 QQ26 || 
|- id="2001 TK150" bgcolor=#E9E9E9
| 0 ||  || MBA-M || 17.2 || 2.0 km || multiple || 2001–2021 || 17 Jan 2021 || 52 || align=left | Disc.: NEAT || 
|- id="2001 TV150" bgcolor=#E9E9E9
| 0 ||  || MBA-M || 17.7 || 1.2 km || multiple || 2001–2019 || 02 Jan 2019 || 89 || align=left | Disc.: NEATAlt.: 2018 UB12 || 
|- id="2001 TX152" bgcolor=#d6d6d6
| 0 ||  || MBA-O || 16.39 || 2.9 km || multiple || 2001–2021 || 17 May 2021 || 150 || align=left | Disc.: NEATAlt.: 2012 TH136 || 
|- id="2001 TN155" bgcolor=#fefefe
| 0 ||  || HUN || 18.7 || data-sort-value="0.54" | 540 m || multiple || 2001–2020 || 13 Aug 2020 || 39 || align=left | Disc.: Spacewatch || 
|- id="2001 TW155" bgcolor=#d6d6d6
| 0 ||  || MBA-O || 17.06 || 2.2 km || multiple || 2001–2021 || 07 Apr 2021 || 73 || align=left | Disc.: SpacewatchAlt.: 2003 BQ70 || 
|- id="2001 TQ156" bgcolor=#fefefe
| 0 ||  || MBA-I || 17.8 || data-sort-value="0.82" | 820 m || multiple || 2001–2020 || 11 Oct 2020 || 78 || align=left | Disc.: LPL/Spacewatch II || 
|- id="2001 TR156" bgcolor=#d6d6d6
| 3 ||  || MBA-O || 17.8 || 1.5 km || multiple || 2001–2019 || 05 Feb 2019 || 26 || align=left | Disc.: LPL/Spacewatch II || 
|- id="2001 TY156" bgcolor=#d6d6d6
| 0 ||  || MBA-O || 16.89 || 2.3 km || multiple || 2001–2021 || 08 May 2021 || 59 || align=left | Disc.: LPL/Spacewatch II || 
|- id="2001 TA157" bgcolor=#fefefe
| 1 ||  || MBA-I || 18.7 || data-sort-value="0.54" | 540 m || multiple || 2001–2019 || 03 Oct 2019 || 68 || align=left | Disc.: LPL/Spacewatch IIAlt.: 2012 VV79 || 
|- id="2001 TF157" bgcolor=#E9E9E9
| 0 ||  || MBA-M || 17.3 || 1.9 km || multiple || 2001–2020 || 19 Jan 2020 || 85 || align=left | Disc.: LPL/Spacewatch II || 
|- id="2001 TH157" bgcolor=#fefefe
| 0 ||  || MBA-I || 18.4 || data-sort-value="0.62" | 620 m || multiple || 2001–2021 || 11 Feb 2021 || 53 || align=left | Disc.: LPL/Spacewatch II || 
|- id="2001 TS157" bgcolor=#d6d6d6
| 0 ||  || MBA-O || 17.0 || 2.2 km || multiple || 2001–2020 || 21 Apr 2020 || 53 || align=left | Disc.: Spacewatch || 
|- id="2001 TT157" bgcolor=#d6d6d6
| 0 ||  || MBA-O || 16.3 || 4.2 km || multiple || 2001–2021 || 10 Jun 2021 || 203 || align=left | Disc.: SpacewatchAlt.: 2010 MH9, 2016 GB192 || 
|- id="2001 TU157" bgcolor=#E9E9E9
| 0 ||  || MBA-M || 17.97 || 1.1 km || multiple || 2001–2021 || 10 Apr 2021 || 111 || align=left | Disc.: Spacewatch || 
|- id="2001 TZ159" bgcolor=#E9E9E9
| 0 ||  || MBA-M || 17.82 || 1.1 km || multiple || 2001–2021 || 08 May 2021 || 94 || align=left | Disc.: AMOS || 
|- id="2001 TV161" bgcolor=#E9E9E9
| 0 ||  || MBA-M || 18.56 || data-sort-value="0.62" | 650 m || multiple || 1997-2022 || 29 Nov 2022 || 62 || align=left | Disc.: NEATAlt.: 2022 SP181 || 
|- id="2001 TD162" bgcolor=#E9E9E9
| 1 ||  || MBA-M || 17.5 || data-sort-value="0.94" | 940 m || multiple || 2001–2021 || 07 Jun 2021 || 73 || align=left | Disc.: NEAT || 
|- id="2001 TP162" bgcolor=#fefefe
| 1 ||  || MBA-I || 18.5 || data-sort-value="0.59" | 590 m || multiple || 2001–2019 || 20 Dec 2019 || 90 || align=left | Disc.: NEAT || 
|- id="2001 TS162" bgcolor=#E9E9E9
| 0 ||  || MBA-M || 17.53 || 1.3 km || multiple || 2001–2021 || 08 May 2021 || 75 || align=left | Disc.: NEAT || 
|- id="2001 TO163" bgcolor=#fefefe
| 0 ||  || MBA-I || 17.48 || data-sort-value="0.95" | 950 m || multiple || 2001–2021 || 02 Apr 2021 || 148 || align=left | Disc.: NEATAlt.: 2014 DT77 || 
|- id="2001 TO165" bgcolor=#fefefe
| 0 ||  || MBA-I || 17.5 || data-sort-value="0.94" | 940 m || multiple || 2001–2020 || 23 Dec 2020 || 199 || align=left | Disc.: LINEAR || 
|- id="2001 TJ166" bgcolor=#d6d6d6
| 0 ||  || MBA-O || 16.0 || 3.5 km || multiple || 2001–2020 || 17 Apr 2020 || 131 || align=left | Disc.: LINEAR || 
|- id="2001 TM167" bgcolor=#fefefe
| 0 ||  || MBA-I || 17.0 || 1.2 km || multiple || 2001–2020 || 22 Mar 2020 || 133 || align=left | Disc.: LINEARAlt.: 2014 KA60 || 
|- id="2001 TD171" bgcolor=#E9E9E9
| 1 ||  || MBA-M || 18.3 || 1.2 km || multiple || 2001–2019 || 01 Jun 2019 || 93 || align=left | Disc.: AMOS || 
|- id="2001 TJ173" bgcolor=#E9E9E9
| 0 ||  || MBA-M || 17.2 || 2.0 km || multiple || 2001–2021 || 07 Jan 2021 || 233 || align=left | Disc.: LINEARAlt.: 2010 MY29 || 
|- id="2001 TR173" bgcolor=#d6d6d6
| 0 ||  || MBA-O || 17.23 || 2.0 km || multiple || 1996–2021 || 12 May 2021 || 66 || align=left | Disc.: LINEAR || 
|- id="2001 TY173" bgcolor=#E9E9E9
| 1 ||  || MBA-M || 17.0 || 1.2 km || multiple || 2001–2020 || 16 May 2020 || 88 || align=left | Disc.: LINEAR || 
|- id="2001 TZ174" bgcolor=#d6d6d6
| 0 ||  || MBA-O || 16.23 || 3.2 km || multiple || 2001–2020 || 26 May 2020 || 165 || align=left | Disc.: LINEARAlt.: 2014 CW20 || 
|- id="2001 TW175" bgcolor=#fefefe
| 1 ||  || MBA-I || 18.0 || data-sort-value="0.75" | 750 m || multiple || 2001–2020 || 27 Apr 2020 || 47 || align=left | Disc.: LINEAR || 
|- id="2001 TP177" bgcolor=#E9E9E9
| 0 ||  || MBA-M || 17.5 || 1.3 km || multiple || 2001–2020 || 16 May 2020 || 113 || align=left | Disc.: LINEARAlt.: 2014 SM292 || 
|- id="2001 TR177" bgcolor=#E9E9E9
| 0 ||  || MBA-M || 17.2 || 2.0 km || multiple || 2001–2021 || 17 Jan 2021 || 68 || align=left | Disc.: LINEARAlt.: 2010 KP100 || 
|- id="2001 TA180" bgcolor=#fefefe
| 0 ||  || MBA-I || 18.87 || data-sort-value="0.50" | 500 m || multiple || 2001–2021 || 30 Jun 2021 || 60 || align=left | Disc.: LINEARAlt.: 2018 RR20, 2018 RW22 || 
|- id="2001 TL181" bgcolor=#fefefe
| 0 ||  || MBA-I || 17.97 || data-sort-value="0.76" | 760 m || multiple || 2001–2021 || 31 May 2021 || 74 || align=left | Disc.: LINEARAlt.: 2008 VS30 || 
|- id="2001 TO181" bgcolor=#fefefe
| 0 ||  || MBA-I || 17.7 || data-sort-value="0.86" | 860 m || multiple || 2001–2021 || 19 Jan 2021 || 141 || align=left | Disc.: LINEAR || 
|- id="2001 TT181" bgcolor=#fefefe
| 0 ||  || MBA-I || 17.82 || data-sort-value="0.81" | 810 m || multiple || 2000–2021 || 20 Apr 2021 || 58 || align=left | Disc.: LINEAR || 
|- id="2001 TV181" bgcolor=#FA8072
| 3 ||  || MCA || 18.4 || data-sort-value="0.88" | 880 m || multiple || 2001–2019 || 07 Jan 2019 || 33 || align=left | Disc.: LINEAR || 
|- id="2001 TU183" bgcolor=#fefefe
| 0 ||  || MBA-I || 18.1 || data-sort-value="0.71" | 710 m || multiple || 2001–2019 || 27 Oct 2019 || 94 || align=left | Disc.: LINEARAlt.: 2005 XH90 || 
|- id="2001 TX183" bgcolor=#d6d6d6
| 0 ||  || MBA-O || 16.5 || 2.8 km || multiple || 2001–2021 || 15 Jun 2021 || 127 || align=left | Disc.: LINEARAlt.: 2005 GQ61 || 
|- id="2001 TO184" bgcolor=#fefefe
| 0 ||  || MBA-I || 18.56 || data-sort-value="0.58" | 580 m || multiple || 2001–2021 || 09 May 2021 || 75 || align=left | Disc.: LINEAR || 
|- id="2001 TV184" bgcolor=#fefefe
| 0 ||  || MBA-I || 17.8 || data-sort-value="0.82" | 820 m || multiple || 1997–2020 || 14 Dec 2020 || 167 || align=left | Disc.: LINEARAlt.: 2016 RT3 || 
|- id="2001 TJ185" bgcolor=#E9E9E9
| 0 ||  || MBA-M || 17.5 || 1.3 km || multiple || 2001–2020 || 15 Feb 2020 || 92 || align=left | Disc.: LINEARAlt.: 2014 WL11, 2018 SG8 || 
|- id="2001 TO186" bgcolor=#fefefe
| 0 ||  || MBA-I || 18.6 || data-sort-value="0.57" | 570 m || multiple || 2001–2020 || 20 Oct 2020 || 162 || align=left | Disc.: LINEAR || 
|- id="2001 TW186" bgcolor=#d6d6d6
| 0 ||  || MBA-O || 17.3 || 1.9 km || multiple || 2001–2020 || 19 Jul 2020 || 120 || align=left | Disc.: LINEARAlt.: 2006 UF85 || 
|- id="2001 TN193" bgcolor=#fefefe
| 0 ||  || MBA-I || 18.4 || data-sort-value="0.62" | 620 m || multiple || 2001–2019 || 27 Sep 2019 || 119 || align=left | Disc.: LINEAR || 
|- id="2001 TO193" bgcolor=#FA8072
| 1 ||  || MCA || 19.17 || data-sort-value="0.44" | 440 m || multiple || 2001–2022 || 06 Jan 2022 || 64 || align=left | Disc.: LINEARAlt.: 2014 QG207 || 
|- id="2001 TE199" bgcolor=#E9E9E9
| 0 ||  || MBA-M || 17.8 || 1.2 km || multiple || 2001–2020 || 16 Mar 2020 || 151 || align=left | Disc.: LINEARAlt.: 2011 AV4 || 
|- id="2001 TA201" bgcolor=#E9E9E9
| 0 ||  || MBA-M || 16.9 || 1.8 km || multiple || 2001–2019 || 28 Dec 2019 || 145 || align=left | Disc.: LINEAR || 
|- id="2001 TF202" bgcolor=#fefefe
| 0 ||  || MBA-I || 18.47 || data-sort-value="0.60" | 600 m || multiple || 2001–2021 || 31 May 2021 || 80 || align=left | Disc.: LINEAR || 
|- id="2001 TG205" bgcolor=#fefefe
| 0 ||  || MBA-I || 17.55 || data-sort-value="0.92" | 920 m || multiple || 2001–2021 || 16 May 2021 || 173 || align=left | Disc.: LINEAR || 
|- id="2001 TH205" bgcolor=#d6d6d6
| 0 ||  || MBA-O || 15.97 || 3.6 km || multiple || 2001–2020 || 01 Jan 2020 || 88 || align=left | Disc.: LINEARAlt.: 2018 SP10 || 
|- id="2001 TL205" bgcolor=#fefefe
| 0 ||  || MBA-I || 18.0 || data-sort-value="0.75" | 750 m || multiple || 2001–2020 || 11 Jul 2020 || 123 || align=left | Disc.: LINEAR || 
|- id="2001 TR205" bgcolor=#E9E9E9
| 0 ||  || MBA-M || 17.74 || 1.2 km || multiple || 2001–2021 || 11 Jun 2021 || 84 || align=left | Disc.: LINEAR || 
|- id="2001 TX206" bgcolor=#fefefe
| 1 ||  || MBA-I || 18.1 || data-sort-value="0.71" | 710 m || multiple || 1994–2020 || 30 Jan 2020 || 85 || align=left | Disc.: NEATAlt.: 2015 RT98 || 
|- id="2001 TC207" bgcolor=#fefefe
| 1 ||  || MBA-I || 18.3 || data-sort-value="0.65" | 650 m || multiple || 1994–2021 || 18 Jan 2021 || 98 || align=left | Disc.: NEAT || 
|- id="2001 TD207" bgcolor=#fefefe
| 2 ||  || MBA-I || 19.5 || data-sort-value="0.37" | 370 m || multiple || 2001–2018 || 16 Nov 2018 || 39 || align=left | Disc.: NEAT || 
|- id="2001 TX207" bgcolor=#d6d6d6
| 0 ||  || MBA-O || 16.4 || 2.9 km || multiple || 2001–2021 || 15 Jan 2021 || 106 || align=left | Disc.: NEATAlt.: 2005 GT111, 2006 KE79, 2006 OJ34, 2007 UD55, 2013 WO3, 2016 EZ141 || 
|- id="2001 TS209" bgcolor=#E9E9E9
| 0 ||  || MBA-M || 17.46 || 1.4 km || multiple || 2001–2021 || 07 Apr 2021 || 107 || align=left | Disc.: Ondřejov Obs.Alt.: 2014 RB46 || 
|- id="2001 TB210" bgcolor=#FA8072
| 0 ||  || MCA || 17.7 || data-sort-value="0.86" | 860 m || multiple || 2001–2019 || 04 Dec 2019 || 125 || align=left | Disc.: Spacewatch || 
|- id="2001 TD210" bgcolor=#fefefe
| 0 ||  || MBA-I || 17.0 || 1.2 km || multiple || 2001–2021 || 14 Jan 2021 || 163 || align=left | Disc.: NEATAlt.: 2012 RA14, 2016 XC6 || 
|- id="2001 TL210" bgcolor=#E9E9E9
| 1 ||  || MBA-M || 17.3 || 1.9 km || multiple || 2001–2019 || 02 Jul 2019 || 32 || align=left | Disc.: LONEOS || 
|- id="2001 TD212" bgcolor=#fefefe
| 0 ||  || MBA-I || 18.1 || data-sort-value="0.71" | 710 m || multiple || 2001–2016 || 29 Nov 2016 || 79 || align=left | Disc.: LINEARAlt.: 2016 WK16 || 
|- id="2001 TH213" bgcolor=#E9E9E9
| 3 ||  || MBA-M || 18.1 || 1.0 km || multiple || 2001–2018 || 10 Dec 2018 || 41 || align=left | Disc.: LONEOS || 
|- id="2001 TB216" bgcolor=#fefefe
| 1 ||  || MBA-I || 17.6 || data-sort-value="0.90" | 900 m || multiple || 2001–2021 || 18 Jan 2021 || 65 || align=left | Disc.: NEATAlt.: 2010 CX121 || 
|- id="2001 TH216" bgcolor=#E9E9E9
| 0 ||  || MBA-M || 17.25 || 2.0 km || multiple || 2001–2021 || 14 Apr 2021 || 262 || align=left | Disc.: NEATAlt.: 2010 VO195 || 
|- id="2001 TT218" bgcolor=#E9E9E9
| 0 ||  || MBA-M || 17.68 || 1.2 km || multiple || 2001–2021 || 09 May 2021 || 190 || align=left | Disc.: LONEOS || 
|- id="2001 TV218" bgcolor=#E9E9E9
| 4 ||  || MBA-M || 18.1 || 1.3 km || multiple || 2001–2019 || 06 Jul 2019 || 24 || align=left | Disc.: LONEOS || 
|- id="2001 TK220" bgcolor=#d6d6d6
| 0 ||  || MBA-O || 16.4 || 2.9 km || multiple || 2001–2019 || 23 Apr 2019 || 73 || align=left | Disc.: LINEAR || 
|- id="2001 TW220" bgcolor=#E9E9E9
| 0 ||  || MBA-M || 17.13 || 1.1 km || multiple || 2001–2021 || 10 Jul 2021 || 113 || align=left | Disc.: LINEARAlt.: 2014 WT354, 2018 YC4 || 
|- id="2001 TY220" bgcolor=#E9E9E9
| 0 ||  || MBA-M || 17.0 || 1.7 km || multiple || 2001–2020 || 17 Apr 2020 || 100 || align=left | Disc.: LINEARAlt.: 2016 GT130 || 
|- id="2001 TL222" bgcolor=#E9E9E9
| 0 ||  || MBA-M || 17.04 || 1.6 km || multiple || 2001–2021 || 31 Mar 2021 || 190 || align=left | Disc.: LPL/Spacewatch IIAlt.: 2010 VM204 || 
|- id="2001 TU222" bgcolor=#E9E9E9
| 1 ||  || MBA-M || 17.6 || data-sort-value="0.90" | 900 m || multiple || 2001–2018 || 15 Dec 2018 || 30 || align=left | Disc.: LINEAR || 
|- id="2001 TW222" bgcolor=#E9E9E9
| 0 ||  || MBA-M || 17.66 || 1.2 km || multiple || 2001–2021 || 08 May 2021 || 132 || align=left | Disc.: LPL/Spacewatch II || 
|- id="2001 TK223" bgcolor=#E9E9E9
| 0 ||  || MBA-M || 16.7 || 1.9 km || multiple || 2001–2021 || 08 Jun 2021 || 208 || align=left | Disc.: LINEAR || 
|- id="2001 TT223" bgcolor=#E9E9E9
| 0 ||  || MBA-M || 17.09 || 1.6 km || multiple || 2001–2021 || 09 May 2021 || 122 || align=left | Disc.: LINEARAlt.: 2014 SW45 || 
|- id="2001 TK224" bgcolor=#FA8072
| 4 ||  || MCA || 19.8 || data-sort-value="0.33" | 330 m || multiple || 2001–2014 || 30 Sep 2014 || 15 || align=left | Disc.: Spacewatch || 
|- id="2001 TU224" bgcolor=#E9E9E9
| 0 ||  || MBA-M || 18.04 || data-sort-value="0.73" | 730 m || multiple || 2001–2021 || 01 Jul 2021 || 58 || align=left | Disc.: LINEAR || 
|- id="2001 TN225" bgcolor=#fefefe
| 0 ||  || MBA-I || 17.7 || data-sort-value="0.86" | 860 m || multiple || 2001–2021 || 12 Jan 2021 || 143 || align=left | Disc.: LINEARAlt.: 2014 DE28 || 
|- id="2001 TL228" bgcolor=#E9E9E9
| 1 ||  || MBA-M || 17.9 || 1.5 km || multiple || 2001–2019 || 19 Nov 2019 || 49 || align=left | Disc.: Spacewatch || 
|- id="2001 TP230" bgcolor=#E9E9E9
| 1 ||  || MBA-M || 17.7 || 1.2 km || multiple || 2001-2019 || 24 Oct 2019 || 42 || align=left | Disc.: LPL/Spacewatch IIAlt.: 2015 SZ48 || 
|- id="2001 TP231" bgcolor=#fefefe
| 4 ||  || MBA-I || 18.9 || data-sort-value="0.49" | 490 m || multiple || 2001–2020 || 14 Nov 2020 || 37 || align=left | Disc.: LPL/Spacewatch IIAdded on 9 March 2021Alt.: 2005 UF334, 2020 TX11 || 
|- id="2001 TU231" bgcolor=#E9E9E9
| 0 ||  || MBA-M || 18.27 || data-sort-value="0.93" | 930 m || multiple || 2001–2021 || 14 Jun 2021 || 46 || align=left | Disc.: Spacewatch || 
|- id="2001 TY231" bgcolor=#d6d6d6
| 0 ||  || MBA-O || 17.20 || 2.0 km || multiple || 2001–2021 || 14 May 2021 || 194 || align=left | Disc.: Spacewatch || 
|- id="2001 TQ232" bgcolor=#fefefe
| 0 ||  || MBA-I || 17.7 || data-sort-value="0.86" | 860 m || multiple || 2001–2019 || 19 Dec 2019 || 106 || align=left | Disc.: NEATAlt.: 2011 HN33 || 
|- id="2001 TT232" bgcolor=#E9E9E9
| 0 ||  || MBA-M || 16.6 || 2.7 km || multiple || 1999–2021 || 05 Jan 2021 || 183 || align=left | Disc.: SDSSAlt.: 1999 FG75, 2006 VP112 || 
|- id="2001 TV232" bgcolor=#FA8072
| 1 ||  || MCA || 18.43 || data-sort-value="0.61" | 610 m || multiple || 2001–2021 || 18 Apr 2021 || 63 || align=left | Disc.: NEAT || 
|- id="2001 TQ233" bgcolor=#d6d6d6
| 0 ||  || MBA-O || 15.95 || 3.6 km || multiple || 2001–2021 || 12 May 2021 || 175 || align=left | Disc.: AMOSAlt.: 2015 CA57 || 
|- id="2001 TH234" bgcolor=#E9E9E9
| 0 ||  || MBA-M || 17.7 || 1.6 km || multiple || 2001–2019 || 27 Oct 2019 || 71 || align=left | Disc.: Spacewatch || 
|- id="2001 TY234" bgcolor=#E9E9E9
| 0 ||  || MBA-M || 16.70 || 2.5 km || multiple || 2001–2021 || 01 Apr 2021 || 196 || align=left | Disc.: SpacewatchAlt.: 2010 RN116 || 
|- id="2001 TQ235" bgcolor=#d6d6d6
| 0 ||  || MBA-O || 17.3 || 1.9 km || multiple || 2001–2021 || 04 Jan 2021 || 255 || align=left | Disc.: NEAT || 
|- id="2001 TL236" bgcolor=#d6d6d6
| 0 ||  || MBA-O || 15.79 || 3.9 km || multiple || 2001–2021 || 30 Jul 2021 || 295 || align=left | Disc.: NEATAlt.: 2012 TP318 || 
|- id="2001 TK237" bgcolor=#E9E9E9
| 0 ||  || MBA-M || 17.6 || 1.7 km || multiple || 2001–2021 || 16 Jan 2021 || 54 || align=left | Disc.: NEATAlt.: 2010 RD2 || 
|- id="2001 TM237" bgcolor=#fefefe
| 0 ||  || MBA-I || 18.0 || data-sort-value="0.75" | 750 m || multiple || 2001–2019 || 30 Oct 2019 || 93 || align=left | Disc.: Desert Eagle Obs. || 
|- id="2001 TU239" bgcolor=#d6d6d6
| 3 ||  || MBA-O || 18.3 || 1.2 km || multiple || 2001–2016 || 08 Aug 2016 || 23 || align=left | Disc.: Terskol Obs. || 
|- id="2001 TZ239" bgcolor=#FA8072
| 1 ||  || MCA || 18.8 || data-sort-value="0.52" | 520 m || multiple || 2001–2019 || 17 Dec 2019 || 31 || align=left | Disc.: NEAT || 
|- id="2001 TV240" bgcolor=#E9E9E9
| 0 ||  || MBA-M || 17.8 || 1.2 km || multiple || 2001–2020 || 26 Jan 2020 || 62 || align=left | Disc.: LINEAR || 
|- id="2001 TF242" bgcolor=#E9E9E9
| 0 ||  || MBA-M || 18.6 || data-sort-value="0.57" | 570 m || multiple || 2001–2021 || 07 Sep 2021 || 52 || align=left | Disc.: AstrovirtelAdded on 5 November 2021Alt.: 2021 QA13 || 
|- id="2001 TG242" bgcolor=#d6d6d6
| 0 ||  || MBA-O || 17.32 || 2 km || multiple || 2001-2022 || 24 Dec 2022 || 88 || align=left | Disc.: AstrovirtelAlt.: 2016 QD37 || 
|- id="2001 TH242" bgcolor=#fefefe
| 0 ||  || MBA-I || 18.3 || data-sort-value="0.65" | 650 m || multiple || 2001–2020 || 15 Oct 2020 || 60 || align=left | Disc.: Astrovirtel || 
|- id="2001 TM242" bgcolor=#E9E9E9
| 0 ||  || MBA-M || 17.7 || data-sort-value="0.86" | 860 m || multiple || 2001–2020 || 25 May 2020 || 79 || align=left | Disc.: Astrovirtel || 
|- id="2001 TN242" bgcolor=#fefefe
| 2 ||  || MBA-I || 20.0 || data-sort-value="0.30" | 300 m || multiple || 2001–2019 || 19 Nov 2019 || 26 || align=left | Disc.: AstrovirtelAdded on 30 September 2021 || 
|- id="2001 TY242" bgcolor=#E9E9E9
| 0 ||  || MBA-M || 16.0 || 3.5 km || multiple || 2001–2021 || 08 Jan 2021 || 149 || align=left | Disc.: LINEARAlt.: 2004 LM9 || 
|- id="2001 TC243" bgcolor=#E9E9E9
| 0 ||  || MBA-M || 17.8 || 1.2 km || multiple || 2001–2019 || 02 Dec 2019 || 47 || align=left | Disc.: SDSS || 
|- id="2001 TL243" bgcolor=#d6d6d6
| 0 ||  || MBA-O || 16.3 || 3.1 km || multiple || 2001–2020 || 22 Sep 2020 || 39 || align=left | Disc.: SDSSAdded on 17 January 2021 || 
|- id="2001 TP243" bgcolor=#d6d6d6
| 0 ||  || MBA-O || 16.6 || 2.7 km || multiple || 2001–2020 || 19 Apr 2020 || 86 || align=left | Disc.: SDSSAlt.: 2012 TN44, 2014 BT52, 2017 PQ6 || 
|- id="2001 TY243" bgcolor=#fefefe
| 0 ||  || MBA-I || 18.98 || data-sort-value="0.48" | 480 m || multiple || 2001–2021 || 09 Nov 2021 || 55 || align=left | Disc.: SDSSAdded on 5 November 2021Alt.: 2021 RX96 || 
|- id="2001 TA244" bgcolor=#d6d6d6
| 3 ||  || MBA-O || 17.6 || 1.7 km || multiple || 2001–2018 || 10 Jan 2018 || 18 || align=left | Disc.: SDSS || 
|- id="2001 TE244" bgcolor=#E9E9E9
| 0 ||  || MBA-M || 17.71 || 1.6 km || multiple || 2001–2020 || 23 Oct 2020 || 36 || align=left | Disc.: SDSSAdded on 11 May 2021 || 
|- id="2001 TF244" bgcolor=#fefefe
| 0 ||  || MBA-I || 17.9 || data-sort-value="0.78" | 780 m || multiple || 2001–2020 || 21 Sep 2020 || 66 || align=left | Disc.: SDSSAdded on 19 October 2020 || 
|- id="2001 TG244" bgcolor=#E9E9E9
| 0 ||  || MBA-M || 17.3 || 1.9 km || multiple || 2001–2020 || 18 Oct 2020 || 64 || align=left | Disc.: SDSS || 
|- id="2001 TK244" bgcolor=#E9E9E9
| 0 ||  || MBA-M || 17.6 || 1.3 km || multiple || 2001–2018 || 13 Jul 2018 || 60 || align=left | Disc.: SDSS || 
|- id="2001 TM244" bgcolor=#E9E9E9
| 0 ||  || MBA-M || 17.80 || 1.2 km || multiple || 2001–2021 || 07 Apr 2021 || 54 || align=left | Disc.: SDSS || 
|- id="2001 TD245" bgcolor=#E9E9E9
| 0 ||  || MBA-M || 17.8 || 1.5 km || multiple || 2001–2019 || 26 Sep 2019 || 50 || align=left | Disc.: SDSSAlt.: 2010 MP6 || 
|- id="2001 TF245" bgcolor=#E9E9E9
| 2 ||  || MBA-M || 18.1 || data-sort-value="0.71" | 710 m || multiple || 2001–2021 || 09 Jul 2021 || 42 || align=left | Disc.: SDSSAdded on 21 August 2021 || 
|- id="2001 TG245" bgcolor=#d6d6d6
| 0 ||  || MBA-O || 17.03 || 2.2 km || multiple || 2001–2021 || 09 Apr 2021 || 78 || align=left | Disc.: SDSSAlt.: 2012 SQ61 || 
|- id="2001 TH245" bgcolor=#fefefe
| 0 ||  || MBA-I || 18.20 || data-sort-value="0.68" | 680 m || multiple || 2001–2022 || 25 Jan 2022 || 67 || align=left | Disc.: SDSSAlt.: 2005 TW160 || 
|- id="2001 TL245" bgcolor=#d6d6d6
| 1 ||  || MBA-O || 17.3 || 1.9 km || multiple || 2001–2019 || 03 Jan 2019 || 60 || align=left | Disc.: SDSSAlt.: 2013 YT133 || 
|- id="2001 TS245" bgcolor=#d6d6d6
| 0 ||  || MBA-O || 16.48 || 2.8 km || multiple || 2001–2021 || 08 Jun 2021 || 108 || align=left | Disc.: SDSSAlt.: 2019 BP7 || 
|- id="2001 TU245" bgcolor=#d6d6d6
| 0 ||  || MBA-O || 17.08 || 2.1 km || multiple || 2001–2021 || 08 May 2021 || 53 || align=left | Disc.: SDSSAdded on 22 July 2020 || 
|- id="2001 TX245" bgcolor=#E9E9E9
| 0 ||  || MBA-M || 17.10 || 1.6 km || multiple || 2001–2021 || 09 Apr 2021 || 104 || align=left | Disc.: SDSSAlt.: 2016 CR233 || 
|- id="2001 TY245" bgcolor=#d6d6d6
| – ||  || MBA-O || 17.6 || 1.7 km || single || 26 days || 15 Oct 2001 || 7 || align=left | Disc.: SDSS || 
|- id="2001 TD246" bgcolor=#d6d6d6
| 4 ||  || MBA-O || 16.95 || 2.3 km || multiple || 2001–2021 || 19 Apr 2021 || 27 || align=left | Disc.: SDSSAdded on 11 May 2021 || 
|- id="2001 TF246" bgcolor=#d6d6d6
| 0 ||  || MBA-O || 16.66 || 2.6 km || multiple || 2001–2021 || 09 Aug 2021 || 94 || align=left | Disc.: SDSS || 
|- id="2001 TJ246" bgcolor=#d6d6d6
| 0 ||  || MBA-O || 16.8 || 2.4 km || multiple || 2001–2021 || 07 Jan 2021 || 45 || align=left | Disc.: SDSS || 
|- id="2001 TM246" bgcolor=#fefefe
| 0 ||  || MBA-I || 18.77 || data-sort-value="0.52" | 520 m || multiple || 2001–2021 || 04 Jan 2021 || 38 || align=left | Disc.: SDSSAdded on 21 August 2021Alt.: 2012 QC70 || 
|- id="2001 TP246" bgcolor=#d6d6d6
| 2 ||  || MBA-O || 17.8 || 1.5 km || multiple || 2001–2017 || 07 Dec 2017 || 26 || align=left | Disc.: SDSSAdded on 21 August 2021Alt.: 2017 VX37 || 
|- id="2001 TV246" bgcolor=#d6d6d6
| 0 ||  || MBA-O || 16.77 || 2.5 km || multiple || 2001–2021 || 11 Jun 2021 || 94 || align=left | Disc.: SDSSAdded on 22 July 2020Alt.: 2010 MA139 || 
|- id="2001 TY246" bgcolor=#E9E9E9
| 0 ||  || MBA-M || 17.2 || 2.0 km || multiple || 2001–2019 || 24 Aug 2019 || 42 || align=left | Disc.: SDSSAdded on 22 July 2020 || 
|- id="2001 TF247" bgcolor=#E9E9E9
| 0 ||  || MBA-M || 17.4 || data-sort-value="0.98" | 980 m || multiple || 2000–2020 || 26 Feb 2020 || 45 || align=left | Disc.: SDSSAlt.: 2005 QQ47 || 
|- id="2001 TH247" bgcolor=#d6d6d6
| 0 ||  || MBA-O || 16.58 || 2.7 km || multiple || 2001–2020 || 25 May 2020 || 143 || align=left | Disc.: SDSS || 
|- id="2001 TK247" bgcolor=#E9E9E9
| 0 ||  || MBA-M || 17.71 || 1.2 km || multiple || 2001–2021 || 08 May 2021 || 81 || align=left | Disc.: SDSSAlt.: 2012 FR15 || 
|- id="2001 TL247" bgcolor=#fefefe
| 0 ||  || MBA-I || 18.73 || data-sort-value="0.53" | 530 m || multiple || 2001–2021 || 17 Jan 2021 || 31 || align=left | Disc.: SDSSAdded on 21 August 2021Alt.: 2012 SN93 || 
|- id="2001 TO247" bgcolor=#E9E9E9
| 2 ||  || MBA-M || 18.3 || data-sort-value="0.92" | 920 m || multiple || 2001–2014 || 18 Sep 2014 || 36 || align=left | Disc.: SDSSAlt.: 2014 RU32 || 
|- id="2001 TV247" bgcolor=#d6d6d6
| 0 ||  || MBA-O || 17.1 || 2.1 km || multiple || 2001–2020 || 22 Apr 2020 || 55 || align=left | Disc.: SDSSAlt.: 2017 UU63 || 
|- id="2001 TB248" bgcolor=#d6d6d6
| 0 ||  || MBA-O || 17.4 || 1.8 km || multiple || 2001–2017 || 29 Jul 2017 || 31 || align=left | Disc.: SDSSAlt.: 2012 TF165 || 
|- id="2001 TC248" bgcolor=#fefefe
| 0 ||  || MBA-I || 18.1 || data-sort-value="0.71" | 710 m || multiple || 2001–2017 || 14 Aug 2017 || 66 || align=left | Disc.: SDSSAlt.: 2014 QK301, 2014 SK201 || 
|- id="2001 TH248" bgcolor=#d6d6d6
| 2 ||  || HIL || 16.4 || 2.9 km || multiple || 2001–2017 || 22 Oct 2017 || 26 || align=left | Disc.: SDSSAdded on 22 July 2020 || 
|- id="2001 TJ248" bgcolor=#fefefe
| 0 ||  || MBA-I || 19.2 || data-sort-value="0.43" | 430 m || multiple || 2001–2019 || 25 Sep 2019 || 136 || align=left | Disc.: SDSS || 
|- id="2001 TL248" bgcolor=#E9E9E9
| 1 ||  || MBA-M || 18.1 || 1.3 km || multiple || 2001–2019 || 01 Nov 2019 || 55 || align=left | Disc.: SDSS || 
|- id="2001 TP248" bgcolor=#E9E9E9
| 0 ||  || MBA-M || 17.55 || data-sort-value="0.92" | 920 m || multiple || 2001–2021 || 30 Jun 2021 || 99 || align=left | Disc.: SDSSAlt.: 2014 WN374 || 
|- id="2001 TE249" bgcolor=#fefefe
| 0 ||  || MBA-I || 18.4 || data-sort-value="0.62" | 620 m || multiple || 2001–2020 || 20 Oct 2020 || 99 || align=left | Disc.: SDSS || 
|- id="2001 TH249" bgcolor=#d6d6d6
| 0 ||  || MBA-O || 17.13 || 2.1 km || multiple || 2001–2021 || 08 May 2021 || 83 || align=left | Disc.: SDSS || 
|- id="2001 TK249" bgcolor=#fefefe
| 0 ||  || MBA-I || 18.8 || data-sort-value="0.52" | 520 m || multiple || 2001–2019 || 03 Oct 2019 || 48 || align=left | Disc.: SDSS || 
|- id="2001 TX249" bgcolor=#d6d6d6
| 0 ||  || MBA-O || 16.8 || 2.4 km || multiple || 2001–2020 || 24 Dec 2020 || 57 || align=left | Disc.: SDSS || 
|- id="2001 TZ249" bgcolor=#d6d6d6
| 0 ||  || MBA-O || 16.9 || 2.3 km || multiple || 2001–2019 || 25 Nov 2019 || 31 || align=left | Disc.: SDSSAdded on 22 July 2020 || 
|- id="2001 TE250" bgcolor=#E9E9E9
| 0 ||  || MBA-M || 17.54 || 1.7 km || multiple || 2001–2022 || 27 Jan 2022 || 88 || align=left | Disc.: SDSSAlt.: 2018 FR20 || 
|- id="2001 TJ250" bgcolor=#fefefe
| 0 ||  || MBA-I || 19.65 || data-sort-value="0.35" | 350 m || multiple || 2001–2021 || 09 Dec 2021 || 41 || align=left | Disc.: SDSSAdded on 21 August 2021 || 
|- id="2001 TK250" bgcolor=#fefefe
| 0 ||  || MBA-I || 19.1 || data-sort-value="0.45" | 450 m || multiple || 2001–2020 || 23 Sep 2020 || 45 || align=left | Disc.: SDSS || 
|- id="2001 TL250" bgcolor=#fefefe
| 0 ||  || MBA-I || 18.1 || data-sort-value="0.71" | 710 m || multiple || 2001–2020 || 10 Dec 2020 || 67 || align=left | Disc.: SDSSAlt.: 2012 QU42 || 
|- id="2001 TZ250" bgcolor=#d6d6d6
| 0 ||  || MBA-O || 17.6 || 1.7 km || multiple || 2001–2020 || 15 Sep 2020 || 54 || align=left | Disc.: SDSSAdded on 17 January 2021Alt.: 2006 UQ167, 2014 HX102, 2015 RH6 || 
|- id="2001 TB251" bgcolor=#d6d6d6
| 0 ||  || MBA-O || 17.8 || 1.5 km || multiple || 2001–2018 || 06 Oct 2018 || 38 || align=left | Disc.: SDSS || 
|- id="2001 TF251" bgcolor=#fefefe
| 0 ||  || MBA-I || 18.16 || data-sort-value="0.69" | 690 m || multiple || 2001–2021 || 27 Dec 2021 || 90 || align=left | Disc.: SDSSAlt.: 2007 EC82 || 
|- id="2001 TG251" bgcolor=#d6d6d6
| 1 ||  || MBA-O || 17.3 || 1.9 km || multiple || 2001–2020 || 22 Apr 2020 || 88 || align=left | Disc.: SDSS || 
|- id="2001 TN251" bgcolor=#d6d6d6
| 1 ||  || MBA-O || 17.33 || 1.9 km || multiple || 2001–2021 || 03 Oct 2021 || 29 || align=left | Disc.: SDSS || 
|- id="2001 TS251" bgcolor=#E9E9E9
| – ||  || MBA-M || 17.7 || data-sort-value="0.86" | 860 m || single || 15 days || 25 Oct 2001 || 13 || align=left | Disc.: SDSS || 
|- id="2001 TT251" bgcolor=#d6d6d6
| 0 ||  || MBA-O || 17.51 || 1.8 km || multiple || 2001–2021 || 09 Nov 2021 || 61 || align=left | Disc.: SDSSAdded on 22 July 2020 || 
|- id="2001 TW251" bgcolor=#E9E9E9
| 0 ||  || MBA-M || 18.04 || data-sort-value="0.73" | 730 m || multiple || 2001–2021 || 05 Jul 2021 || 44 || align=left | Disc.: SDSS || 
|- id="2001 TA252" bgcolor=#E9E9E9
| 0 ||  || MBA-M || 17.06 || 1.6 km || multiple || 2001–2021 || 03 May 2021 || 92 || align=left | Disc.: SDSSAlt.: 2010 VO49 || 
|- id="2001 TE252" bgcolor=#fefefe
| 1 ||  || MBA-I || 18.9 || data-sort-value="0.49" | 490 m || multiple || 2001–2020 || 06 Dec 2020 || 39 || align=left | Disc.: SDSSAdded on 22 July 2020 || 
|- id="2001 TK252" bgcolor=#E9E9E9
| 0 ||  || MBA-M || 17.4 || 1.8 km || multiple || 2001–2019 || 03 Jul 2019 || 45 || align=left | Disc.: SDSSAlt.: 2015 TE66 || 
|- id="2001 TM252" bgcolor=#E9E9E9
| 1 ||  || MBA-M || 18.3 || data-sort-value="0.92" | 920 m || multiple || 2001–2019 || 02 Dec 2019 || 31 || align=left | Disc.: SDSSAlt.: 2014 SP78 || 
|- id="2001 TP252" bgcolor=#d6d6d6
| 0 ||  || MBA-O || 16.86 || 2.4 km || multiple || 2001–2021 || 15 Apr 2021 || 75 || align=left | Disc.: SDSSAdded on 22 July 2020 || 
|- id="2001 TR252" bgcolor=#E9E9E9
| 0 ||  || MBA-M || 18.0 || 1.1 km || multiple || 2001–2020 || 03 Jan 2020 || 41 || align=left | Disc.: SDSS || 
|- id="2001 TT252" bgcolor=#E9E9E9
| 1 ||  || MBA-M || 18.2 || 1.3 km || multiple || 2001–2019 || 28 Oct 2019 || 31 || align=left | Disc.: SDSSAdded on 21 August 2021 || 
|- id="2001 TV252" bgcolor=#d6d6d6
| 0 ||  || MBA-O || 16.95 || 2.3 km || multiple || 2001–2021 || 14 Jul 2021 || 89 || align=left | Disc.: SDSSAdded on 22 July 2020 || 
|- id="2001 TZ252" bgcolor=#E9E9E9
| 0 ||  || MBA-M || 17.4 || 1.8 km || multiple || 2001–2021 || 18 Jan 2021 || 112 || align=left | Disc.: SDSSAlt.: 2010 RJ118 || 
|- id="2001 TA253" bgcolor=#d6d6d6
| 0 ||  || MBA-O || 16.97 || 2.2 km || multiple || 2001–2018 || 07 Aug 2018 || 42 || align=left | Disc.: SDSS || 
|- id="2001 TE253" bgcolor=#E9E9E9
| 0 ||  || MBA-M || 17.64 || 1.2 km || multiple || 2001–2021 || 14 Apr 2021 || 58 || align=left | Disc.: SDSS || 
|- id="2001 TF253" bgcolor=#E9E9E9
| 0 ||  || MBA-M || 17.6 || 1.7 km || multiple || 2001–2019 || 03 Oct 2019 || 38 || align=left | Disc.: SDSSAdded on 22 July 2020 || 
|- id="2001 TG253" bgcolor=#E9E9E9
| 0 ||  || MBA-M || 17.5 || 1.3 km || multiple || 2001–2021 || 12 Feb 2021 || 66 || align=left | Disc.: SDSSAdded on 17 June 2021Alt.: 2014 QA302, 2014 SW180 || 
|- id="2001 TJ253" bgcolor=#d6d6d6
| 0 ||  || MBA-O || 16.22 || 3.2 km || multiple || 2001–2020 || 11 Jun 2020 || 183 || align=left | Disc.: SDSS || 
|- id="2001 TL253" bgcolor=#E9E9E9
| – ||  || MBA-M || 19.3 || data-sort-value="0.41" | 410 m || single || 11 days || 25 Oct 2001 || 9 || align=left | Disc.: SDSS || 
|- id="2001 TP253" bgcolor=#fefefe
| 0 ||  || MBA-I || 18.6 || data-sort-value="0.57" | 570 m || multiple || 2001–2019 || 28 Dec 2019 || 41 || align=left | Disc.: SDSS || 
|- id="2001 TR253" bgcolor=#E9E9E9
| 0 ||  || MBA-M || 17.3 || 1.9 km || multiple || 2001–2020 || 16 Dec 2020 || 59 || align=left | Disc.: SDSSAdded on 22 July 2020 || 
|- id="2001 TX253" bgcolor=#E9E9E9
| 3 ||  || MBA-M || 18.1 || data-sort-value="0.71" | 710 m || multiple || 2001–2015 || 22 Jan 2015 || 16 || align=left | Disc.: SDSSAlt.: 2015 BN347 || 
|- id="2001 TY253" bgcolor=#d6d6d6
| 0 ||  || MBA-O || 16.63 || 2.6 km || multiple || 1999–2020 || 25 May 2020 || 95 || align=left | Disc.: SDSSAlt.: 2012 WZ15 || 
|- id="2001 TZ253" bgcolor=#E9E9E9
| 0 ||  || MBA-M || 18.09 || 1.0 km || multiple || 2001–2021 || 30 Jun 2021 || 43 || align=left | Disc.: SDSS || 
|- id="2001 TA254" bgcolor=#d6d6d6
| 0 ||  || MBA-O || 17.05 || 2.2 km || multiple || 1996–2021 || 11 Jul 2021 || 59 || align=left | Disc.: SDSS || 
|- id="2001 TB254" bgcolor=#E9E9E9
| 1 ||  || MBA-M || 18.6 || data-sort-value="0.80" | 800 m || multiple || 2001–2018 || 08 Jul 2018 || 19 || align=left | Disc.: SDSSAdded on 21 August 2021 || 
|- id="2001 TC254" bgcolor=#fefefe
| 1 ||  || MBA-I || 19.32 || data-sort-value="0.41" | 410 m || multiple || 2001–2021 || 30 Nov 2021 || 45 || align=left | Disc.: SDSS || 
|- id="2001 TE254" bgcolor=#E9E9E9
| 0 ||  || MBA-M || 17.3 || 1.9 km || multiple || 2001–2021 || 07 Jan 2021 || 119 || align=left | Disc.: SDSS || 
|- id="2001 TG254" bgcolor=#d6d6d6
| 0 ||  || MBA-O || 17.26 || 2.0 km || multiple || 2001–2021 || 17 Apr 2021 || 29 || align=left | Disc.: SDSSAdded on 21 August 2021Alt.: 2016 HH33 || 
|- id="2001 TH254" bgcolor=#d6d6d6
| 0 ||  || MBA-O || 17.02 || 2.2 km || multiple || 2001–2020 || 25 May 2020 || 51 || align=left | Disc.: SDSS || 
|- id="2001 TR254" bgcolor=#E9E9E9
| 0 ||  || MBA-M || 18.00 || 1.4 km || multiple || 2001–2020 || 07 Dec 2020 || 28 || align=left | Disc.: SDSS || 
|- id="2001 TS254" bgcolor=#E9E9E9
| 0 ||  || MBA-M || 17.2 || 1.5 km || multiple || 2001–2020 || 22 Jan 2020 || 109 || align=left | Disc.: SDSS || 
|- id="2001 TV254" bgcolor=#d6d6d6
| 0 ||  || HIL || 15.4 || 4.6 km || multiple || 2001–2021 || 15 Jan 2021 || 73 || align=left | Disc.: SDSS || 
|- id="2001 TY254" bgcolor=#d6d6d6
| 0 ||  || MBA-O || 16.30 || 3.1 km || multiple || 2001–2021 || 29 Apr 2021 || 166 || align=left | Disc.: SDSS || 
|- id="2001 TE255" bgcolor=#d6d6d6
| 2 ||  || HIL || 16.3 || 3.1 km || multiple || 2001–2017 || 23 Sep 2017 || 22 || align=left | Disc.: SDSSAdded on 22 July 2020 || 
|- id="2001 TG255" bgcolor=#d6d6d6
| 0 ||  || MBA-O || 17.3 || 1.9 km || multiple || 2001–2018 || 04 Dec 2018 || 49 || align=left | Disc.: SDSSAlt.: 2007 VD264 || 
|- id="2001 TH255" bgcolor=#d6d6d6
| 1 ||  || MBA-O || 17.3 || 1.9 km || multiple || 2001–2017 || 29 Sep 2017 || 29 || align=left | Disc.: SDSSAlt.: 2015 HG129 || 
|- id="2001 TM255" bgcolor=#d6d6d6
| 0 ||  || MBA-O || 17.58 || 1.7 km || multiple || 2001–2022 || 27 Jan 2022 || 92 || align=left | Disc.: SDSS || 
|- id="2001 TO255" bgcolor=#d6d6d6
| 0 ||  || MBA-O || 16.6 || 2.7 km || multiple || 2001–2020 || 13 May 2020 || 108 || align=left | Disc.: SDSSAlt.: 2014 DN138 || 
|- id="2001 TQ255" bgcolor=#d6d6d6
| 0 ||  || MBA-O || 16.6 || 2.7 km || multiple || 2001–2021 || 08 Jun 2021 || 87 || align=left | Disc.: SDSSAlt.: 2018 VW70 || 
|- id="2001 TS255" bgcolor=#d6d6d6
| 1 ||  || MBA-O || 17.3 || 1.9 km || multiple || 2001–2017 || 14 Dec 2017 || 31 || align=left | Disc.: SDSS || 
|- id="2001 TM256" bgcolor=#E9E9E9
| 1 ||  || MBA-M || 17.6 || 1.3 km || multiple || 2001–2019 || 25 Jan 2019 || 49 || align=left | Disc.: NEATAlt.: 2011 CP66 || 
|- id="2001 TD257" bgcolor=#fefefe
| 1 ||  || MBA-I || 19.18 || data-sort-value="0.43" | 430 m || multiple || 2001–2021 || 10 Nov 2021 || 43 || align=left | Disc.: NEAT || 
|- id="2001 TP257" bgcolor=#E9E9E9
| 1 ||  || MBA-M || 19.49 || data-sort-value="0.34" | 380 m || multiple || 2001-2022 || 19 Dec 2022 || 64 || align=left | Disc.: NEAT || 
|- id="2001 TR257" bgcolor=#E9E9E9
| 2 ||  || MBA-M || 19.3 || data-sort-value="0.77" | 770 m || multiple || 2001–2015 || 03 Dec 2015 || 24 || align=left | Disc.: NEAT || 
|- id="2001 TA258" bgcolor=#fefefe
| 0 ||  || MBA-I || 17.1 || 1.1 km || multiple || 2001–2021 || 16 Jan 2021 || 99 || align=left | Disc.: NEAT || 
|- id="2001 TG258" bgcolor=#E9E9E9
| 0 ||  || MBA-M || 17.71 || data-sort-value="0.85" | 850 m || multiple || 2000–2021 || 01 Oct 2021 || 47 || align=left | Disc.: NEAT || 
|- id="2001 TA259" bgcolor=#E9E9E9
| 0 ||  || MBA-M || 18.21 || data-sort-value="0.68" | 680 m || multiple || 2001–2021 || 31 Aug 2021 || 81 || align=left | Disc.: NEATAlt.: 2011 FU98 || 
|- id="2001 TC259" bgcolor=#fefefe
| 0 ||  || MBA-I || 17.9 || data-sort-value="0.78" | 780 m || multiple || 2001–2020 || 08 Dec 2020 || 58 || align=left | Disc.: NEATAlt.: 2012 RM31 || 
|- id="2001 TE259" bgcolor=#fefefe
| 0 ||  || MBA-I || 18.9 || data-sort-value="0.49" | 490 m || multiple || 2001–2019 || 24 Dec 2019 || 57 || align=left | Disc.: NEAT || 
|- id="2001 TH259" bgcolor=#fefefe
| 0 ||  || MBA-I || 18.5 || data-sort-value="0.52" | 600 m || multiple || 2001-2022 || 19 Nov 2022 || 82 || align=left | Disc.: NEAT || 
|- id="2001 TJ259" bgcolor=#E9E9E9
| 0 ||  || MBA-M || 16.9 || 1.8 km || multiple || 2001–2020 || 12 Dec 2020 || 147 || align=left | Disc.: NEATAlt.: 2013 MQ1 || 
|- id="2001 TK259" bgcolor=#fefefe
| 0 ||  || MBA-I || 18.52 || data-sort-value="0.59" | 590 m || multiple || 2001–2022 || 09 Jan 2022 || 82 || align=left | Disc.: NEAT || 
|- id="2001 TR259" bgcolor=#fefefe
| 0 ||  || MBA-I || 18.4 || data-sort-value="0.62" | 620 m || multiple || 2001–2019 || 27 Nov 2019 || 127 || align=left | Disc.: NEAT || 
|- id="2001 TS259" bgcolor=#E9E9E9
| 0 ||  || MBA-M || 17.1 || 2.1 km || multiple || 2001–2021 || 14 Jan 2021 || 121 || align=left | Disc.: NEATAlt.: 2015 RJ208 || 
|- id="2001 TU259" bgcolor=#fefefe
| 0 ||  || MBA-I || 18.5 || data-sort-value="0.59" | 590 m || multiple || 2001–2020 || 23 Jun 2020 || 83 || align=left | Disc.: NEATAlt.: 2014 SJ345 || 
|- id="2001 TV259" bgcolor=#fefefe
| 0 ||  || MBA-I || 18.3 || data-sort-value="0.65" | 650 m || multiple || 2001–2019 || 27 Sep 2019 || 105 || align=left | Disc.: NEATAlt.: 2012 UL118 || 
|- id="2001 TC260" bgcolor=#E9E9E9
| 0 ||  || MBA-M || 17.2 || 2.0 km || multiple || 2001–2021 || 16 Jan 2021 || 128 || align=left | Disc.: SDSSAlt.: 2010 ND11 || 
|- id="2001 TE260" bgcolor=#fefefe
| 0 ||  || MBA-I || 19.0 || data-sort-value="0.47" | 470 m || multiple || 2001–2019 || 04 Sep 2019 || 198 || align=left | Disc.: SDSSAlt.: 2012 UF52 || 
|- id="2001 TG260" bgcolor=#E9E9E9
| – ||  || MBA-M || 19.8 || data-sort-value="0.61" | 610 m || single || 11 days || 25 Oct 2001 || 6 || align=left | Disc.: SDSS || 
|- id="2001 TH260" bgcolor=#E9E9E9
| 0 ||  || MBA-M || 17.7 || 1.2 km || multiple || 2001–2020 || 23 Mar 2020 || 122 || align=left | Disc.: SDSSAlt.: 2010 YH5 || 
|- id="2001 TL260" bgcolor=#d6d6d6
| 1 ||  || MBA-O || 17.3 || 1.9 km || multiple || 2001–2021 || 20 Mar 2021 || 39 || align=left | Disc.: SDSSAlt.: 2018 VF127 || 
|- id="2001 TM260" bgcolor=#fefefe
| – ||  || MBA-I || 20.3 || data-sort-value="0.26" | 260 m || single || 11 days || 25 Oct 2001 || 6 || align=left | Disc.: SDSS || 
|- id="2001 TO260" bgcolor=#fefefe
| 0 ||  || MBA-I || 18.79 || data-sort-value="0.52" | 520 m || multiple || 2001–2021 || 24 Nov 2021 || 102 || align=left | Disc.: SDSS || 
|- id="2001 TP260" bgcolor=#d6d6d6
| 0 ||  || MBA-O || 17.39 || 1.9 km || multiple || 2001–2021 || 31 Aug 2021 || 49 || align=left | Disc.: SDSS || 
|- id="2001 TT260" bgcolor=#fefefe
| 0 ||  || MBA-I || 17.8 || data-sort-value="0.82" | 820 m || multiple || 2001–2021 || 16 Jan 2021 || 139 || align=left | Disc.: SDSSAlt.: 2012 PG44 || 
|- id="2001 TD261" bgcolor=#E9E9E9
| – ||  || MBA-M || 18.4 || data-sort-value="0.62" | 620 m || single || 8 days || 18 Oct 2001 || 10 || align=left | Disc.: NEAT || 
|- id="2001 TE261" bgcolor=#E9E9E9
| 1 ||  || MBA-M || 17.8 || data-sort-value="0.82" | 820 m || multiple || 2001–2017 || 13 Aug 2017 || 41 || align=left | Disc.: NEAT || 
|- id="2001 TG261" bgcolor=#E9E9E9
| 0 ||  || MBA-M || 17.1 || 2.1 km || multiple || 2001–2019 || 20 Dec 2019 || 104 || align=left | Disc.: NEAT || 
|- id="2001 TH261" bgcolor=#E9E9E9
| – ||  || MBA-M || 19.4 || data-sort-value="0.39" | 390 m || single || 13 days || 23 Oct 2001 || 12 || align=left | Disc.: NEAT || 
|- id="2001 TL261" bgcolor=#d6d6d6
| 0 ||  || MBA-O || 17.28 || 1.9 km || multiple || 2001–2021 || 30 Nov 2021 || 57 || align=left | Disc.: NEAT || 
|- id="2001 TP261" bgcolor=#E9E9E9
| 0 ||  || MBA-M || 17.65 || 1.2 km || multiple || 2001–2021 || 08 May 2021 || 82 || align=left | Disc.: NEAT || 
|- id="2001 TS261" bgcolor=#E9E9E9
| 0 ||  || MBA-M || 17.28 || 1.5 km || multiple || 2001–2021 || 30 May 2021 || 176 || align=left | Disc.: NEATAlt.: 2014 SG246 || 
|- id="2001 TT261" bgcolor=#E9E9E9
| 0 ||  || MBA-M || 16.9 || 2.3 km || multiple || 2001–2020 || 31 Jan 2020 || 110 || align=left | Disc.: NEATAlt.: 2014 OY278 || 
|- id="2001 TU261" bgcolor=#d6d6d6
| 0 ||  || MBA-O || 16.65 || 2.6 km || multiple || 2001–2021 || 22 Apr 2021 || 59 || align=left | Disc.: NEAT || 
|- id="2001 TV261" bgcolor=#FA8072
| 1 ||  || MCA || 18.41 || data-sort-value="0.62" | 620 m || multiple || 2001–2021 || 30 Nov 2021 || 74 || align=left | Disc.: NEAT || 
|- id="2001 TW261" bgcolor=#E9E9E9
| 1 ||  || MBA-M || 18.31 || data-sort-value="0.65" | 650 m || multiple || 2001–2021 || 30 Oct 2021 || 60 || align=left | Disc.: NEAT || 
|- id="2001 TY261" bgcolor=#fefefe
| 0 ||  || MBA-I || 18.0 || data-sort-value="0.75" | 750 m || multiple || 2001–2020 || 20 Feb 2020 || 97 || align=left | Disc.: NEAT || 
|- id="2001 TA262" bgcolor=#fefefe
| 0 ||  || MBA-I || 17.3 || 1.5 km || multiple || 2001–2021 || 17 Jan 2021 || 92 || align=left | Disc.: NEATAlt.: 2010 GO151 || 
|- id="2001 TB262" bgcolor=#E9E9E9
| 0 ||  || MBA-M || 17.83 || data-sort-value="0.81" | 810 m || multiple || 2001–2021 || 24 Oct 2021 || 120 || align=left | Disc.: NEAT || 
|- id="2001 TC262" bgcolor=#E9E9E9
| – ||  || MBA-M || 17.9 || data-sort-value="0.78" | 780 m || single || 16 days || 24 Oct 2001 || 8 || align=left | Disc.: NEAT || 
|- id="2001 TF262" bgcolor=#E9E9E9
| 0 ||  || MBA-M || 17.1 || 2.1 km || multiple || 1996–2021 || 14 Jan 2021 || 177 || align=left | Disc.: NEATAlt.: 2012 BM73 || 
|- id="2001 TH262" bgcolor=#E9E9E9
| 0 ||  || MBA-M || 17.20 || 1.5 km || multiple || 2001–2021 || 07 Apr 2021 || 148 || align=left | Disc.: NEATAlt.: 2010 UQ25 || 
|- id="2001 TJ262" bgcolor=#fefefe
| 0 ||  || MBA-I || 17.57 || data-sort-value="0.91" | 910 m || multiple || 2001–2022 || 27 Jan 2022 || 178 || align=left | Disc.: NEAT || 
|- id="2001 TL262" bgcolor=#d6d6d6
| 0 ||  || MBA-O || 16.8 || 2.4 km || multiple || 1995–2021 || 07 Jun 2021 || 53 || align=left | Disc.: NEATAlt.: 2012 UD148 || 
|- id="2001 TM262" bgcolor=#E9E9E9
| 0 ||  || MBA-M || 17.04 || 1.6 km || multiple || 2001–2021 || 05 Jul 2021 || 281 || align=left | Disc.: NEATAlt.: 2010 XO38 || 
|- id="2001 TO262" bgcolor=#fefefe
| 0 ||  || MBA-I || 17.7 || data-sort-value="0.86" | 860 m || multiple || 2001–2021 || 18 Jan 2021 || 149 || align=left | Disc.: NEATAlt.: 2010 CS25 || 
|- id="2001 TP262" bgcolor=#E9E9E9
| 0 ||  || MBA-M || 17.43 || data-sort-value="0.97" | 970 m || multiple || 2001–2021 || 08 Aug 2021 || 58 || align=left | Disc.: NEAT || 
|- id="2001 TR262" bgcolor=#E9E9E9
| 0 ||  || MBA-M || 17.35 || 1.0 km || multiple || 2001–2021 || 31 Oct 2021 || 304 || align=left | Disc.: NEATAlt.: 2008 GQ24 || 
|- id="2001 TV262" bgcolor=#d6d6d6
| 0 ||  || MBA-O || 16.92 || 2.3 km || multiple || 2001–2021 || 18 May 2021 || 62 || align=left | Disc.: NEAT || 
|- id="2001 TX262" bgcolor=#E9E9E9
| 0 ||  || MBA-M || 17.5 || 1.3 km || multiple || 2001–2020 || 15 Apr 2020 || 106 || align=left | Disc.: NEATAlt.: 2014 YU47 || 
|- id="2001 TY262" bgcolor=#fefefe
| 0 ||  || MBA-I || 18.4 || data-sort-value="0.62" | 620 m || multiple || 2001–2019 || 23 Oct 2019 || 96 || align=left | Disc.: NEAT || 
|- id="2001 TZ262" bgcolor=#d6d6d6
| 0 ||  || MBA-O || 16.5 || 2.8 km || multiple || 2001–2020 || 23 May 2020 || 150 || align=left | Disc.: NEATAlt.: 2007 VL228 || 
|- id="2001 TA263" bgcolor=#E9E9E9
| 0 ||  || MBA-M || 17.7 || 1.2 km || multiple || 2001–2019 || 01 Jan 2019 || 77 || align=left | Disc.: NEATAlt.: 2014 SG219 || 
|- id="2001 TB263" bgcolor=#fefefe
| 0 ||  || MBA-I || 18.5 || data-sort-value="0.59" | 590 m || multiple || 2001–2021 || 09 Jun 2021 || 106 || align=left | Disc.: NEAT || 
|- id="2001 TC263" bgcolor=#fefefe
| 0 ||  || MBA-I || 18.5 || data-sort-value="0.59" | 590 m || multiple || 2001–2019 || 24 Dec 2019 || 55 || align=left | Disc.: NEATAlt.: 2015 PH181 || 
|- id="2001 TD263" bgcolor=#fefefe
| 0 ||  || HUN || 18.09 || data-sort-value="0.72" | 720 m || multiple || 2001–2021 || 06 May 2021 || 170 || align=left | Disc.: NEATAlt.: 2008 EE32, 2009 WB106 || 
|- id="2001 TG263" bgcolor=#E9E9E9
| 1 ||  || MBA-M || 17.7 || 1.6 km || multiple || 2001–2019 || 07 Sep 2019 || 61 || align=left | Disc.: NEATAlt.: 2010 MC36 || 
|- id="2001 TH263" bgcolor=#fefefe
| 0 ||  || MBA-I || 18.4 || data-sort-value="0.62" | 620 m || multiple || 2001–2021 || 15 Jan 2021 || 49 || align=left | Disc.: NEAT || 
|- id="2001 TL263" bgcolor=#d6d6d6
| 0 ||  || MBA-O || 16.2 || 3.2 km || multiple || 1996–2020 || 16 Apr 2020 || 137 || align=left | Disc.: NEATAlt.: 2017 UP8 || 
|- id="2001 TN263" bgcolor=#d6d6d6
| 0 ||  || MBA-O || 15.6 || 4.2 km || multiple || 2001–2021 || 31 May 2021 || 162 || align=left | Disc.: NEATAlt.: 2010 CN190, 2010 OY93 || 
|- id="2001 TO263" bgcolor=#fefefe
| 0 ||  || MBA-I || 18.0 || data-sort-value="0.75" | 750 m || multiple || 2001–2021 || 15 Jan 2021 || 37 || align=left | Disc.: NEAT || 
|- id="2001 TP263" bgcolor=#E9E9E9
| 0 ||  || MBA-M || 16.8 || 2.4 km || multiple || 2001–2020 || 22 Dec 2020 || 92 || align=left | Disc.: NEATAlt.: 2014 QF345 || 
|- id="2001 TU263" bgcolor=#d6d6d6
| 0 ||  || MBA-O || 17.14 || 2.1 km || multiple || 1994–2022 || 05 Jan 2022 || 127 || align=left | Disc.: Spacewatch || 
|- id="2001 TV263" bgcolor=#fefefe
| 0 ||  || MBA-I || 17.49 || data-sort-value="0.94" | 940 m || multiple || 2001–2022 || 25 Jan 2022 || 165 || align=left | Disc.: SDSS || 
|- id="2001 TX263" bgcolor=#d6d6d6
| 0 ||  || MBA-O || 17.00 || 2.2 km || multiple || 2001–2021 || 09 Sep 2021 || 155 || align=left | Disc.: SDSS || 
|- id="2001 TY263" bgcolor=#E9E9E9
| 0 ||  || MBA-M || 17.42 || 1.4 km || multiple || 2001–2021 || 10 Apr 2021 || 102 || align=left | Disc.: SDSS || 
|- id="2001 TZ263" bgcolor=#fefefe
| 0 ||  || MBA-I || 17.1 || 1.1 km || multiple || 2001–2020 || 16 Dec 2020 || 119 || align=left | Disc.: NEAT || 
|- id="2001 TA264" bgcolor=#d6d6d6
| 0 ||  || MBA-O || 16.3 || 3.1 km || multiple || 2001–2020 || 25 May 2020 || 104 || align=left | Disc.: SDSS || 
|- id="2001 TC264" bgcolor=#d6d6d6
| 0 ||  || MBA-O || 16.44 || 2.9 km || multiple || 2001–2021 || 22 May 2021 || 84 || align=left | Disc.: SDSS || 
|- id="2001 TF264" bgcolor=#E9E9E9
| 0 ||  || MBA-M || 17.5 || 1.3 km || multiple || 2001–2018 || 02 Oct 2018 || 64 || align=left | Disc.: NEAT || 
|- id="2001 TG264" bgcolor=#E9E9E9
| 0 ||  || MBA-M || 17.1 || 2.1 km || multiple || 2001–2019 || 02 Nov 2019 || 89 || align=left | Disc.: SDSS || 
|- id="2001 TJ264" bgcolor=#d6d6d6
| 0 ||  || MBA-O || 16.2 || 3.2 km || multiple || 2001–2020 || 25 Jan 2020 || 94 || align=left | Disc.: SDSS || 
|- id="2001 TK264" bgcolor=#E9E9E9
| 0 ||  || MBA-M || 16.7 || 2.5 km || multiple || 2001–2021 || 15 Jan 2021 || 115 || align=left | Disc.: Spacewatch || 
|- id="2001 TL264" bgcolor=#fefefe
| 0 ||  || MBA-I || 17.8 || data-sort-value="0.82" | 820 m || multiple || 2001–2020 || 14 Nov 2020 || 88 || align=left | Disc.: SDSS || 
|- id="2001 TM264" bgcolor=#d6d6d6
| 0 ||  || MBA-O || 16.4 || 2.9 km || multiple || 2001–2020 || 26 Apr 2020 || 83 || align=left | Disc.: Spacewatch || 
|- id="2001 TN264" bgcolor=#fefefe
| 0 ||  || HUN || 18.5 || data-sort-value="0.59" | 590 m || multiple || 2001–2019 || 07 Jan 2019 || 56 || align=left | Disc.: Spacewatch || 
|- id="2001 TO264" bgcolor=#fefefe
| 0 ||  || MBA-I || 17.8 || data-sort-value="0.82" | 820 m || multiple || 2001–2020 || 18 Dec 2020 || 62 || align=left | Disc.: Spacewatch || 
|- id="2001 TP264" bgcolor=#d6d6d6
| 0 ||  || MBA-O || 16.52 || 2.8 km || multiple || 1995–2021 || 03 Apr 2021 || 117 || align=left | Disc.: SDSS || 
|- id="2001 TQ264" bgcolor=#d6d6d6
| 0 ||  || MBA-O || 16.48 || 2.8 km || multiple || 2001–2021 || 15 Jun 2021 || 112 || align=left | Disc.: Spacewatch || 
|- id="2001 TR264" bgcolor=#E9E9E9
| 0 ||  || MBA-M || 17.91 || data-sort-value="0.78" | 780 m || multiple || 2001–2021 || 24 Nov 2021 || 102 || align=left | Disc.: SDSS || 
|- id="2001 TT264" bgcolor=#d6d6d6
| 0 ||  || MBA-O || 16.7 || 2.5 km || multiple || 1996–2020 || 28 Apr 2020 || 80 || align=left | Disc.: SDSS || 
|- id="2001 TV264" bgcolor=#fefefe
| 0 ||  || MBA-I || 17.4 || data-sort-value="0.98" | 980 m || multiple || 2001–2021 || 18 Jan 2021 || 68 || align=left | Disc.: NEAT || 
|- id="2001 TX264" bgcolor=#fefefe
| 0 ||  || MBA-I || 17.7 || data-sort-value="0.86" | 860 m || multiple || 2001–2019 || 03 Dec 2019 || 89 || align=left | Disc.: Spacewatch || 
|- id="2001 TY264" bgcolor=#d6d6d6
| 0 ||  || MBA-O || 16.4 || 2.9 km || multiple || 2001–2020 || 23 Apr 2020 || 70 || align=left | Disc.: Spacewatch || 
|- id="2001 TZ264" bgcolor=#fefefe
| 0 ||  || MBA-I || 18.1 || data-sort-value="0.71" | 710 m || multiple || 2001–2020 || 23 Dec 2020 || 56 || align=left | Disc.: SDSS || 
|- id="2001 TB265" bgcolor=#d6d6d6
| 0 ||  || MBA-O || 17.1 || 2.1 km || multiple || 2001–2019 || 02 Apr 2019 || 47 || align=left | Disc.: SDSS || 
|- id="2001 TC265" bgcolor=#E9E9E9
| 0 ||  || MBA-M || 17.8 || 1.2 km || multiple || 2001–2020 || 02 Jan 2020 || 49 || align=left | Disc.: NEAT || 
|- id="2001 TD265" bgcolor=#d6d6d6
| 0 ||  || MBA-O || 17.1 || 2.1 km || multiple || 2001–2020 || 21 Apr 2020 || 52 || align=left | Disc.: SDSS || 
|- id="2001 TE265" bgcolor=#fefefe
| 0 ||  || MBA-I || 18.62 || data-sort-value="0.56" | 560 m || multiple || 2001–2021 || 17 Apr 2021 || 54 || align=left | Disc.: Spacewatch || 
|- id="2001 TF265" bgcolor=#fefefe
| 0 ||  || MBA-I || 18.36 || data-sort-value="0.63" | 630 m || multiple || 2001–2021 || 31 May 2021 || 88 || align=left | Disc.: SDSS || 
|- id="2001 TG265" bgcolor=#E9E9E9
| 0 ||  || MBA-M || 17.87 || data-sort-value="0.79" | 790 m || multiple || 2001–2021 || 11 May 2021 || 57 || align=left | Disc.: SDSS || 
|- id="2001 TH265" bgcolor=#fefefe
| 0 ||  || MBA-I || 18.2 || data-sort-value="0.68" | 680 m || multiple || 1994–2019 || 17 Dec 2019 || 75 || align=left | Disc.: SDSS || 
|- id="2001 TK265" bgcolor=#d6d6d6
| 0 ||  || MBA-O || 16.8 || 2.4 km || multiple || 2001–2020 || 27 Apr 2020 || 62 || align=left | Disc.: SDSS || 
|- id="2001 TL265" bgcolor=#d6d6d6
| 0 ||  || MBA-O || 16.67 || 2.6 km || multiple || 2001–2021 || 03 Oct 2021 || 142 || align=left | Disc.: SDSS || 
|- id="2001 TM265" bgcolor=#fefefe
| 0 ||  || MBA-I || 18.1 || data-sort-value="0.71" | 710 m || multiple || 2001–2021 || 18 Jan 2021 || 55 || align=left | Disc.: SDSS || 
|- id="2001 TN265" bgcolor=#fefefe
| 0 ||  || MBA-I || 17.8 || data-sort-value="0.82" | 820 m || multiple || 2001–2020 || 20 Oct 2020 || 61 || align=left | Disc.: LPL/Spacewatch II || 
|- id="2001 TO265" bgcolor=#d6d6d6
| 0 ||  || MBA-O || 17.44 || 1.8 km || multiple || 2001–2021 || 08 Aug 2021 || 50 || align=left | Disc.: SDSS || 
|- id="2001 TP265" bgcolor=#fefefe
| 0 ||  || MBA-I || 18.43 || data-sort-value="0.61" | 610 m || multiple || 2001–2021 || 05 Dec 2021 || 76 || align=left | Disc.: NEAT || 
|- id="2001 TR265" bgcolor=#E9E9E9
| 0 ||  || MBA-M || 17.6 || 1.7 km || multiple || 2001–2021 || 18 Jan 2021 || 71 || align=left | Disc.: SDSS || 
|- id="2001 TS265" bgcolor=#d6d6d6
| 0 ||  || MBA-O || 16.5 || 2.8 km || multiple || 2001–2021 || 17 Jan 2021 || 73 || align=left | Disc.: SDSS || 
|- id="2001 TT265" bgcolor=#fefefe
| 0 ||  || MBA-I || 19.21 || data-sort-value="0.43" | 430 m || multiple || 2001–2021 || 08 Sep 2021 || 48 || align=left | Disc.: LPL/Spacewatch II || 
|- id="2001 TU265" bgcolor=#d6d6d6
| 0 ||  || MBA-O || 17.7 || 1.6 km || multiple || 2001–2018 || 20 Jan 2018 || 32 || align=left | Disc.: Spacewatch || 
|- id="2001 TW265" bgcolor=#E9E9E9
| 1 ||  || MBA-M || 17.1 || 1.6 km || multiple || 2001–2021 || 12 Jun 2021 || 79 || align=left | Disc.: SDSS || 
|- id="2001 TX265" bgcolor=#fefefe
| 1 ||  || MBA-I || 18.94 || data-sort-value="0.48" | 480 m || multiple || 2001–2021 || 18 Jan 2021 || 46 || align=left | Disc.: SDSS || 
|- id="2001 TY265" bgcolor=#fefefe
| 0 ||  || MBA-I || 18.49 || data-sort-value="0.60" | 600 m || multiple || 2001–2021 || 14 Apr 2021 || 77 || align=left | Disc.: NEAT || 
|- id="2001 TZ265" bgcolor=#d6d6d6
| 0 ||  || MBA-O || 16.4 || 2.9 km || multiple || 2001–2021 || 18 Jan 2021 || 80 || align=left | Disc.: SDSS || 
|- id="2001 TA266" bgcolor=#C2FFFF
| 0 ||  || JT || 13.4 || 12 km || multiple || 2001–2020 || 23 Jun 2020 || 153 || align=left | Disc.: LPL/Spacewatch IITrojan camp (L5) || 
|- id="2001 TB266" bgcolor=#d6d6d6
| 0 ||  || MBA-O || 16.8 || 2.4 km || multiple || 2001–2020 || 16 May 2020 || 88 || align=left | Disc.: SDSS || 
|- id="2001 TC266" bgcolor=#E9E9E9
| 0 ||  || MBA-M || 16.75 || 1.3 km || multiple || 2001–2021 || 30 Jun 2021 || 153 || align=left | Disc.: NEAT || 
|- id="2001 TD266" bgcolor=#E9E9E9
| 0 ||  || MBA-M || 17.1 || 2.1 km || multiple || 2001–2021 || 04 Jan 2021 || 89 || align=left | Disc.: SDSS || 
|- id="2001 TE266" bgcolor=#E9E9E9
| 0 ||  || MBA-M || 17.40 || 1.8 km || multiple || 2001–2022 || 26 Jan 2022 || 80 || align=left | Disc.: SDSS || 
|- id="2001 TF266" bgcolor=#E9E9E9
| 0 ||  || MBA-M || 17.5 || 1.8 km || multiple || 2001–2019 || 27 Oct 2019 || 58 || align=left | Disc.: LPL/Spacewatch II || 
|- id="2001 TG266" bgcolor=#d6d6d6
| 0 ||  || MBA-O || 16.2 || 3.2 km || multiple || 2001–2020 || 11 Dec 2020 || 69 || align=left | Disc.: SDSS || 
|- id="2001 TH266" bgcolor=#fefefe
| 0 ||  || MBA-I || 17.7 || data-sort-value="0.86" | 860 m || multiple || 2001–2021 || 16 Jan 2021 || 65 || align=left | Disc.: Spacewatch || 
|- id="2001 TJ266" bgcolor=#fefefe
| 0 ||  || MBA-I || 18.2 || data-sort-value="0.68" | 680 m || multiple || 2001–2020 || 23 Jan 2020 || 92 || align=left | Disc.: LPL/Spacewatch II || 
|- id="2001 TK266" bgcolor=#FA8072
| 0 ||  || MCA || 17.78 || 1.2 km || multiple || 2001–2020 || 12 May 2020 || 67 || align=left | Disc.: LONEOS || 
|- id="2001 TM266" bgcolor=#E9E9E9
| 0 ||  || MBA-M || 17.3 || 1.9 km || multiple || 2001–2019 || 29 Nov 2019 || 53 || align=left | Disc.: NEAT || 
|- id="2001 TN266" bgcolor=#E9E9E9
| 0 ||  || MBA-M || 17.3 || 1.9 km || multiple || 2001–2019 || 31 Oct 2019 || 67 || align=left | Disc.: LPL/Spacewatch IIAlt.: 2010 MZ49 || 
|- id="2001 TO266" bgcolor=#fefefe
| 0 ||  || MBA-I || 18.2 || data-sort-value="0.68" | 680 m || multiple || 2001–2021 || 14 Jan 2021 || 53 || align=left | Disc.: SDSS || 
|- id="2001 TP266" bgcolor=#E9E9E9
| 0 ||  || MBA-M || 17.86 || 1.1 km || multiple || 2001–2021 || 13 May 2021 || 54 || align=left | Disc.: LPL/Spacewatch II || 
|- id="2001 TQ266" bgcolor=#E9E9E9
| 1 ||  || MBA-M || 17.9 || 1.5 km || multiple || 2001–2019 || 27 Oct 2019 || 49 || align=left | Disc.: Spacewatch || 
|- id="2001 TR266" bgcolor=#d6d6d6
| 0 ||  || MBA-O || 17.10 || 2.1 km || multiple || 2001–2021 || 08 May 2021 || 70 || align=left | Disc.: SDSS || 
|- id="2001 TS266" bgcolor=#d6d6d6
| 0 ||  || MBA-O || 17.15 || 2.1 km || multiple || 1995–2021 || 10 Apr 2021 || 78 || align=left | Disc.: LPL/Spacewatch II || 
|- id="2001 TT266" bgcolor=#d6d6d6
| 0 ||  || MBA-O || 16.3 || 3.1 km || multiple || 2001–2021 || 22 Jan 2021 || 68 || align=left | Disc.: LPL/Spacewatch II || 
|- id="2001 TU266" bgcolor=#E9E9E9
| 0 ||  || MBA-M || 18.09 || 1.0 km || multiple || 2001–2021 || 20 Mar 2021 || 45 || align=left | Disc.: SDSS || 
|- id="2001 TV266" bgcolor=#E9E9E9
| 0 ||  || MBA-M || 18.3 || data-sort-value="0.92" | 920 m || multiple || 2001–2020 || 21 Jan 2020 || 47 || align=left | Disc.: Spacewatch || 
|- id="2001 TW266" bgcolor=#FA8072
| 1 ||  || MCA || 19.3 || data-sort-value="0.41" | 410 m || multiple || 2001–2019 || 08 May 2019 || 40 || align=left | Disc.: SDSS || 
|- id="2001 TY266" bgcolor=#E9E9E9
| 0 ||  || MBA-M || 17.57 || 1.3 km || multiple || 2001–2021 || 18 May 2021 || 67 || align=left | Disc.: NEAT || 
|- id="2001 TZ266" bgcolor=#fefefe
| 0 ||  || MBA-I || 18.5 || data-sort-value="0.59" | 590 m || multiple || 2001–2021 || 15 Jan 2021 || 50 || align=left | Disc.: Spacewatch || 
|- id="2001 TA267" bgcolor=#E9E9E9
| 0 ||  || MBA-M || 17.78 || 1.2 km || multiple || 2001–2021 || 11 May 2021 || 84 || align=left | Disc.: LPL/Spacewatch II || 
|- id="2001 TB267" bgcolor=#fefefe
| 1 ||  || MBA-I || 18.6 || data-sort-value="0.57" | 570 m || multiple || 2001–2018 || 02 Nov 2018 || 47 || align=left | Disc.: Spacewatch || 
|- id="2001 TC267" bgcolor=#fefefe
| 0 ||  || MBA-I || 18.5 || data-sort-value="0.59" | 590 m || multiple || 2001–2019 || 24 Oct 2019 || 38 || align=left | Disc.: SDSS || 
|- id="2001 TD267" bgcolor=#E9E9E9
| 0 ||  || MBA-M || 18.1 || 1.3 km || multiple || 2001–2019 || 29 Oct 2019 || 39 || align=left | Disc.: SDSS || 
|- id="2001 TE267" bgcolor=#fefefe
| 1 ||  || MBA-I || 19.0 || data-sort-value="0.47" | 470 m || multiple || 2001–2019 || 28 Nov 2019 || 36 || align=left | Disc.: Spacewatch || 
|- id="2001 TF267" bgcolor=#d6d6d6
| 0 ||  || MBA-O || 17.30 || 1.9 km || multiple || 2001–2021 || 15 Apr 2021 || 41 || align=left | Disc.: SDSS || 
|- id="2001 TG267" bgcolor=#d6d6d6
| 0 ||  || HIL || 15.7 || 4.0 km || multiple || 2001–2020 || 16 May 2020 || 79 || align=left | Disc.: SpacewatchAlt.: 2017 UL86 || 
|- id="2001 TH267" bgcolor=#fefefe
| 1 ||  || MBA-I || 18.5 || data-sort-value="0.59" | 590 m || multiple || 2001–2020 || 22 Jan 2020 || 43 || align=left | Disc.: SDSS || 
|- id="2001 TJ267" bgcolor=#fefefe
| 1 ||  || MBA-I || 19.1 || data-sort-value="0.45" | 450 m || multiple || 2001–2019 || 08 Nov 2019 || 43 || align=left | Disc.: Spacewatch || 
|- id="2001 TK267" bgcolor=#d6d6d6
| 0 ||  || MBA-O || 17.02 || 2.2 km || multiple || 2001–2021 || 07 Jun 2021 || 59 || align=left | Disc.: SDSS || 
|- id="2001 TL267" bgcolor=#fefefe
| 0 ||  || MBA-I || 18.0 || data-sort-value="0.75" | 750 m || multiple || 2001–2020 || 24 Jan 2020 || 52 || align=left | Disc.: NEAT || 
|- id="2001 TM267" bgcolor=#E9E9E9
| 0 ||  || MBA-M || 18.2 || data-sort-value="0.68" | 680 m || multiple || 2001–2018 || 15 Dec 2018 || 31 || align=left | Disc.: SDSS || 
|- id="2001 TN267" bgcolor=#d6d6d6
| 0 ||  || MBA-O || 17.0 || 2.2 km || multiple || 2001–2018 || 13 Dec 2018 || 29 || align=left | Disc.: Spacewatch || 
|- id="2001 TO267" bgcolor=#fefefe
| 1 ||  || MBA-I || 18.5 || data-sort-value="0.59" | 590 m || multiple || 2001–2019 || 06 Sep 2019 || 30 || align=left | Disc.: Spacewatch || 
|- id="2001 TP267" bgcolor=#fefefe
| 0 ||  || MBA-I || 18.8 || data-sort-value="0.52" | 520 m || multiple || 2001–2019 || 22 Aug 2019 || 31 || align=left | Disc.: Spacewatch || 
|- id="2001 TQ267" bgcolor=#fefefe
| 0 ||  || MBA-I || 18.8 || data-sort-value="0.52" | 520 m || multiple || 2001–2019 || 23 Sep 2019 || 34 || align=left | Disc.: SDSS || 
|- id="2001 TR267" bgcolor=#fefefe
| 1 ||  || MBA-I || 18.9 || data-sort-value="0.49" | 490 m || multiple || 2001–2017 || 30 Aug 2017 || 32 || align=left | Disc.: SDSS || 
|- id="2001 TS267" bgcolor=#E9E9E9
| 0 ||  || MBA-M || 17.8 || 1.5 km || multiple || 2001–2020 || 16 Dec 2020 || 159 || align=left | Disc.: SDSS || 
|- id="2001 TT267" bgcolor=#fefefe
| 0 ||  || MBA-I || 18.1 || data-sort-value="0.71" | 710 m || multiple || 2001–2019 || 27 Oct 2019 || 76 || align=left | Disc.: SDSS || 
|- id="2001 TU267" bgcolor=#E9E9E9
| 0 ||  || MBA-M || 17.0 || 2.2 km || multiple || 2001–2020 || 07 Dec 2020 || 86 || align=left | Disc.: SDSSAlt.: 2010 JV19 || 
|- id="2001 TV267" bgcolor=#fefefe
| 0 ||  || MBA-I || 18.5 || data-sort-value="0.59" | 590 m || multiple || 2001–2019 || 20 Dec 2019 || 59 || align=left | Disc.: NEAT || 
|- id="2001 TW267" bgcolor=#E9E9E9
| 0 ||  || MBA-M || 17.3 || 1.9 km || multiple || 2001–2020 || 11 Dec 2020 || 69 || align=left | Disc.: Spacewatch || 
|- id="2001 TX267" bgcolor=#fefefe
| 0 ||  || MBA-I || 18.53 || data-sort-value="0.58" | 580 m || multiple || 2001–2021 || 18 May 2021 || 59 || align=left | Disc.: NEAT || 
|- id="2001 TY267" bgcolor=#d6d6d6
| 0 ||  || MBA-O || 16.8 || 2.4 km || multiple || 2001–2021 || 03 Jan 2021 || 62 || align=left | Disc.: SDSS || 
|- id="2001 TZ267" bgcolor=#E9E9E9
| 0 ||  || MBA-M || 17.4 || 1.8 km || multiple || 2001–2019 || 29 Sep 2019 || 56 || align=left | Disc.: SDSS || 
|- id="2001 TA268" bgcolor=#C2FFFF
| 0 ||  || JT || 14.5 || 7.0 km || multiple || 2001–2020 || 26 Jun 2020 || 69 || align=left | Disc.: SpacewatchTrojan camp (L5) || 
|- id="2001 TB268" bgcolor=#d6d6d6
| 0 ||  || MBA-O || 16.52 || 2.8 km || multiple || 2001–2021 || 07 Jun 2021 || 88 || align=left | Disc.: NEATAlt.: 2010 NJ37 || 
|- id="2001 TC268" bgcolor=#E9E9E9
| 1 ||  || MBA-M || 17.8 || 1.5 km || multiple || 2001–2019 || 27 Oct 2019 || 56 || align=left | Disc.: SpacewatchAlt.: 2010 KC103 || 
|- id="2001 TD268" bgcolor=#d6d6d6
| 0 ||  || MBA-O || 16.84 || 2.4 km || multiple || 2001–2021 || 15 Apr 2021 || 65 || align=left | Disc.: LPL/Spacewatch II || 
|- id="2001 TE268" bgcolor=#fefefe
| 0 ||  || MBA-I || 18.0 || data-sort-value="0.75" | 750 m || multiple || 2001–2020 || 17 Nov 2020 || 100 || align=left | Disc.: SDSS || 
|- id="2001 TG268" bgcolor=#fefefe
| 0 ||  || MBA-I || 18.5 || data-sort-value="0.59" | 590 m || multiple || 2001–2019 || 23 Sep 2019 || 40 || align=left | Disc.: SDSS || 
|- id="2001 TH268" bgcolor=#E9E9E9
| 0 ||  || MBA-M || 17.46 || 1.4 km || multiple || 2001–2021 || 03 May 2021 || 58 || align=left | Disc.: SDSS || 
|- id="2001 TJ268" bgcolor=#fefefe
| 0 ||  || MBA-I || 18.57 || data-sort-value="0.57" | 570 m || multiple || 2001–2021 || 13 May 2021 || 70 || align=left | Disc.: SDSS || 
|- id="2001 TK268" bgcolor=#fefefe
| 0 ||  || MBA-I || 18.7 || data-sort-value="0.54" | 540 m || multiple || 2000–2019 || 24 Aug 2019 || 41 || align=left | Disc.: SDSS || 
|- id="2001 TL268" bgcolor=#fefefe
| 0 ||  || MBA-I || 18.2 || data-sort-value="0.68" | 680 m || multiple || 2001–2019 || 03 Oct 2019 || 38 || align=left | Disc.: LPL/Spacewatch II || 
|- id="2001 TM268" bgcolor=#C2FFFF
| 0 ||  || JT || 14.5 || 7.0 km || multiple || 2001–2020 || 23 Jun 2020 || 57 || align=left | Disc.: SDSSTrojan camp (L5) || 
|- id="2001 TN268" bgcolor=#E9E9E9
| 1 ||  || MBA-M || 18.2 || 1.3 km || multiple || 2001–2019 || 03 Sep 2019 || 38 || align=left | Disc.: SDSS || 
|- id="2001 TO268" bgcolor=#d6d6d6
| 0 ||  || MBA-O || 16.63 || 2.6 km || multiple || 2001–2021 || 31 Oct 2021 || 92 || align=left | Disc.: Spacewatch || 
|- id="2001 TP268" bgcolor=#E9E9E9
| 0 ||  || MBA-M || 18.3 || data-sort-value="0.65" | 650 m || multiple || 2001–2020 || 19 Apr 2020 || 28 || align=left | Disc.: SDSS || 
|- id="2001 TQ268" bgcolor=#E9E9E9
| 2 ||  || MBA-M || 17.8 || 1.5 km || multiple || 2001–2019 || 28 Aug 2019 || 30 || align=left | Disc.: LPL/Spacewatch II || 
|- id="2001 TS268" bgcolor=#C2FFFF
| 0 ||  || JT || 14.26 || 7.8 km || multiple || 2001–2021 || 07 Jul 2021 || 132 || align=left | Disc.: SDSSTrojan camp (L5)Alt.: 2012 RM48 || 
|- id="2001 TT268" bgcolor=#E9E9E9
| 0 ||  || MBA-M || 17.68 || 1.2 km || multiple || 2001–2021 || 17 Apr 2021 || 67 || align=left | Disc.: SDSS || 
|- id="2001 TV268" bgcolor=#E9E9E9
| 0 ||  || MBA-M || 17.7 || 1.2 km || multiple || 2001–2020 || 26 Jan 2020 || 45 || align=left | Disc.: SDSS || 
|- id="2001 TW268" bgcolor=#d6d6d6
| 0 ||  || MBA-O || 17.3 || 1.9 km || multiple || 2001–2020 || 19 Apr 2020 || 41 || align=left | Disc.: SDSS || 
|- id="2001 TX268" bgcolor=#fefefe
| 4 ||  || MBA-I || 18.9 || data-sort-value="0.49" | 490 m || multiple || 2001–2019 || 28 Oct 2019 || 23 || align=left | Disc.: SDSS || 
|- id="2001 TZ268" bgcolor=#d6d6d6
| 0 ||  || MBA-O || 16.7 || 2.5 km || multiple || 2001–2020 || 03 Jan 2020 || 52 || align=left | Disc.: SDSS || 
|- id="2001 TA269" bgcolor=#d6d6d6
| 0 ||  || MBA-O || 17.0 || 2.2 km || multiple || 2001–2021 || 10 May 2021 || 52 || align=left | Disc.: ADAS || 
|- id="2001 TB269" bgcolor=#d6d6d6
| 0 ||  || MBA-O || 17.27 || 2.0 km || multiple || 2001–2021 || 13 May 2021 || 56 || align=left | Disc.: SDSS || 
|- id="2001 TC269" bgcolor=#E9E9E9
| 0 ||  || MBA-M || 17.8 || 1.5 km || multiple || 2001–2021 || 17 Jan 2021 || 65 || align=left | Disc.: SDSSAlt.: 2010 NR125 || 
|- id="2001 TD269" bgcolor=#d6d6d6
| 0 ||  || MBA-O || 17.1 || 2.1 km || multiple || 2001–2020 || 26 Jan 2020 || 51 || align=left | Disc.: Spacewatch || 
|- id="2001 TF269" bgcolor=#E9E9E9
| 0 ||  || MBA-M || 18.1 || 1.0 km || multiple || 2001–2020 || 02 Feb 2020 || 48 || align=left | Disc.: Spacewatch || 
|- id="2001 TG269" bgcolor=#d6d6d6
| 2 ||  || MBA-O || 17.28 || 1.9 km || multiple || 2001–2021 || 10 Jul 2021 || 39 || align=left | Disc.: Spacewatch || 
|- id="2001 TH269" bgcolor=#d6d6d6
| 0 ||  || MBA-O || 17.52 || 1.7 km || multiple || 2001–2021 || 31 May 2021 || 47 || align=left | Disc.: SDSS || 
|- id="2001 TJ269" bgcolor=#E9E9E9
| 0 ||  || MBA-M || 17.9 || 1.1 km || multiple || 2001–2019 || 07 Jan 2019 || 36 || align=left | Disc.: NEATAdded on 22 July 2020 || 
|- id="2001 TK269" bgcolor=#d6d6d6
| 0 ||  || MBA-O || 16.8 || 2.4 km || multiple || 2001–2021 || 08 Jun 2021 || 47 || align=left | Disc.: SpacewatchAdded on 19 October 2020 || 
|- id="2001 TL269" bgcolor=#d6d6d6
| 0 ||  || MBA-O || 17.02 || 2.2 km || multiple || 2001–2021 || 09 Aug 2021 || 44 || align=left | Disc.: SDSSAdded on 19 October 2020 || 
|- id="2001 TM269" bgcolor=#fefefe
| 0 ||  || MBA-I || 18.56 || data-sort-value="0.58" | 580 m || multiple || 2001–2022 || 25 Jan 2022 || 41 || align=left | Disc.: SpacewatchAdded on 17 January 2021 || 
|- id="2001 TO269" bgcolor=#E9E9E9
| 0 ||  || MBA-M || 17.7 || 1.6 km || multiple || 2001–2019 || 25 Sep 2019 || 43 || align=left | Disc.: SDSSAdded on 17 January 2021 || 
|- id="2001 TP269" bgcolor=#E9E9E9
| 0 ||  || MBA-M || 18.4 || data-sort-value="0.88" | 880 m || multiple || 2001–2018 || 07 Sep 2018 || 91 || align=left | Disc.: SpacewatchAdded on 17 January 2021 || 
|- id="2001 TQ269" bgcolor=#fefefe
| 2 ||  || MBA-I || 19.7 || data-sort-value="0.34" | 340 m || multiple || 2001–2020 || 14 Dec 2020 || 51 || align=left | Disc.: SDSSAdded on 17 January 2021 || 
|- id="2001 TS269" bgcolor=#d6d6d6
| 0 ||  || MBA-O || 16.9 || 2.3 km || multiple || 2001–2017 || 22 Oct 2017 || 36 || align=left | Disc.: LPL/Spacewatch IIAdded on 9 March 2021 || 
|- id="2001 TT269" bgcolor=#E9E9E9
| 0 ||  || MBA-M || 17.56 || 1.7 km || multiple || 2001–2021 || 12 Feb 2021 || 75 || align=left | Disc.: SpacewatchAdded on 11 May 2021 || 
|- id="2001 TU269" bgcolor=#d6d6d6
| 0 ||  || MBA-O || 16.85 || 2.4 km || multiple || 2001–2021 || 12 Feb 2021 || 42 || align=left | Disc.: SDSSAdded on 17 June 2021 || 
|- id="2001 TV269" bgcolor=#d6d6d6
| 0 ||  || MBA-O || 16.9 || 2.3 km || multiple || 2001–2021 || 08 May 2021 || 48 || align=left | Disc.: SpacewatchAdded on 17 June 2021 || 
|- id="2001 TW269" bgcolor=#d6d6d6
| 0 ||  || MBA-O || 17.1 || 2.1 km || multiple || 2001–2021 || 05 Jul 2021 || 44 || align=left | Disc.: SDSSAdded on 21 August 2021 || 
|- id="2001 TX269" bgcolor=#E9E9E9
| 1 ||  || MBA-M || 18.99 || data-sort-value="0.67" | 670 m || multiple || 2001–2018 || 07 Nov 2018 || 20 || align=left | Disc.: SDSSAdded on 21 August 2021 || 
|- id="2001 TZ269" bgcolor=#FA8072
| 1 ||  || MCA || 20.74 || data-sort-value="0.21" | 210 m || multiple || 2001–2021 || 05 Oct 2021 || 38 || align=left | Disc.: LPL/Spacewatch IIAdded on 30 September 2021 || 
|- id="2001 TA270" bgcolor=#d6d6d6
| 0 ||  || MBA-O || 17.02 || 2.2 km || multiple || 2001–2021 || 07 Nov 2021 || 69 || align=left | Disc.: LPL/Spacewatch IIAdded on 5 November 2021 || 
|- id="2001 TB270" bgcolor=#d6d6d6
| 0 ||  || MBA-O || 17.70 || 1.6 km || multiple || 2001–2021 || 10 Nov 2021 || 40 || align=left | Disc.: SDSSAdded on 24 December 2021 || 
|- id="2001 TC270" bgcolor=#d6d6d6
| 0 ||  || MBA-O || 17.33 || 1.9 km || multiple || 2001–2021 || 19 Mar 2021 || 27 || align=left | Disc.: SDSSAdded on 24 December 2021 || 
|}
back to top

References 
 

Lists of unnumbered minor planets